

345001–345100 

|-bgcolor=#E9E9E9
| 345001 ||  || — || January 16, 2005 || Socorro || LINEAR || — || align=right | 2.1 km || 
|-id=002 bgcolor=#E9E9E9
| 345002 ||  || — || January 16, 2005 || Kitt Peak || Spacewatch || EUN || align=right | 1.5 km || 
|-id=003 bgcolor=#E9E9E9
| 345003 ||  || — || January 16, 2005 || Catalina || CSS || — || align=right | 1.4 km || 
|-id=004 bgcolor=#E9E9E9
| 345004 ||  || — || February 1, 2005 || Catalina || CSS || — || align=right | 1.4 km || 
|-id=005 bgcolor=#E9E9E9
| 345005 ||  || — || February 1, 2005 || Kitt Peak || Spacewatch || — || align=right | 1.5 km || 
|-id=006 bgcolor=#E9E9E9
| 345006 ||  || — || February 1, 2005 || Kitt Peak || Spacewatch || — || align=right | 1.6 km || 
|-id=007 bgcolor=#E9E9E9
| 345007 ||  || — || February 2, 2005 || Kitt Peak || Spacewatch || — || align=right | 1.7 km || 
|-id=008 bgcolor=#E9E9E9
| 345008 ||  || — || February 2, 2005 || Kitt Peak || Spacewatch || — || align=right | 1.3 km || 
|-id=009 bgcolor=#E9E9E9
| 345009 ||  || — || February 2, 2005 || Socorro || LINEAR || — || align=right | 3.6 km || 
|-id=010 bgcolor=#E9E9E9
| 345010 ||  || — || February 3, 2005 || Socorro || LINEAR || — || align=right | 1.5 km || 
|-id=011 bgcolor=#E9E9E9
| 345011 ||  || — || February 1, 2005 || Kitt Peak || Spacewatch || MIS || align=right | 2.8 km || 
|-id=012 bgcolor=#E9E9E9
| 345012 ||  || — || February 9, 2005 || Anderson Mesa || LONEOS || — || align=right | 1.3 km || 
|-id=013 bgcolor=#E9E9E9
| 345013 ||  || — || February 9, 2005 || Socorro || LINEAR || JUN || align=right | 1.2 km || 
|-id=014 bgcolor=#E9E9E9
| 345014 ||  || — || February 28, 2005 || Catalina || CSS || JUN || align=right | 1.1 km || 
|-id=015 bgcolor=#fefefe
| 345015 ||  || — || March 2, 2005 || Catalina || CSS || H || align=right data-sort-value="0.84" | 840 m || 
|-id=016 bgcolor=#E9E9E9
| 345016 ||  || — || March 1, 2005 || Junk Bond || Junk Bond Obs. || — || align=right | 1.5 km || 
|-id=017 bgcolor=#E9E9E9
| 345017 ||  || — || March 2, 2005 || Kitt Peak || Spacewatch || — || align=right | 1.5 km || 
|-id=018 bgcolor=#E9E9E9
| 345018 ||  || — || March 3, 2005 || Kitt Peak || Spacewatch || — || align=right | 2.0 km || 
|-id=019 bgcolor=#E9E9E9
| 345019 ||  || — || March 3, 2005 || Catalina || CSS || — || align=right | 3.5 km || 
|-id=020 bgcolor=#E9E9E9
| 345020 ||  || — || March 4, 2005 || Mount Lemmon || Mount Lemmon Survey || — || align=right | 2.3 km || 
|-id=021 bgcolor=#E9E9E9
| 345021 ||  || — || March 2, 2005 || Catalina || CSS || — || align=right | 3.0 km || 
|-id=022 bgcolor=#E9E9E9
| 345022 ||  || — || March 3, 2005 || Catalina || CSS || — || align=right | 1.6 km || 
|-id=023 bgcolor=#E9E9E9
| 345023 ||  || — || March 4, 2005 || Kitt Peak || Spacewatch || — || align=right | 3.3 km || 
|-id=024 bgcolor=#E9E9E9
| 345024 ||  || — || March 4, 2005 || Catalina || CSS || — || align=right | 3.5 km || 
|-id=025 bgcolor=#E9E9E9
| 345025 ||  || — || March 8, 2005 || Anderson Mesa || LONEOS || — || align=right | 3.0 km || 
|-id=026 bgcolor=#E9E9E9
| 345026 ||  || — || March 3, 2005 || Catalina || CSS || — || align=right | 1.4 km || 
|-id=027 bgcolor=#E9E9E9
| 345027 ||  || — || March 4, 2005 || Mount Lemmon || Mount Lemmon Survey || MAR || align=right | 1.1 km || 
|-id=028 bgcolor=#E9E9E9
| 345028 ||  || — || March 4, 2005 || Mount Lemmon || Mount Lemmon Survey || — || align=right | 1.5 km || 
|-id=029 bgcolor=#E9E9E9
| 345029 ||  || — || March 8, 2005 || Anderson Mesa || LONEOS || — || align=right | 1.5 km || 
|-id=030 bgcolor=#d6d6d6
| 345030 ||  || — || March 10, 2005 || Mount Lemmon || Mount Lemmon Survey || — || align=right | 3.0 km || 
|-id=031 bgcolor=#d6d6d6
| 345031 ||  || — || March 10, 2005 || Kitt Peak || Spacewatch || EOS || align=right | 2.4 km || 
|-id=032 bgcolor=#d6d6d6
| 345032 ||  || — || March 10, 2005 || Mount Lemmon || Mount Lemmon Survey || CHA || align=right | 2.2 km || 
|-id=033 bgcolor=#E9E9E9
| 345033 ||  || — || March 10, 2005 || Mount Lemmon || Mount Lemmon Survey || — || align=right | 2.0 km || 
|-id=034 bgcolor=#E9E9E9
| 345034 ||  || — || March 11, 2005 || Kitt Peak || Spacewatch || — || align=right | 2.0 km || 
|-id=035 bgcolor=#E9E9E9
| 345035 ||  || — || March 11, 2005 || Mount Lemmon || Mount Lemmon Survey || HOF || align=right | 2.7 km || 
|-id=036 bgcolor=#E9E9E9
| 345036 ||  || — || March 8, 2005 || Mount Lemmon || Mount Lemmon Survey || — || align=right | 2.0 km || 
|-id=037 bgcolor=#E9E9E9
| 345037 ||  || — || March 10, 2005 || Siding Spring || SSS || — || align=right | 2.6 km || 
|-id=038 bgcolor=#E9E9E9
| 345038 ||  || — || March 11, 2005 || Mount Lemmon || Mount Lemmon Survey || — || align=right data-sort-value="0.98" | 980 m || 
|-id=039 bgcolor=#E9E9E9
| 345039 ||  || — || March 12, 2005 || Socorro || LINEAR || — || align=right | 4.0 km || 
|-id=040 bgcolor=#E9E9E9
| 345040 ||  || — || March 10, 2005 || Mount Lemmon || Mount Lemmon Survey || — || align=right | 2.1 km || 
|-id=041 bgcolor=#E9E9E9
| 345041 ||  || — || March 10, 2005 || Anderson Mesa || LONEOS || — || align=right | 2.4 km || 
|-id=042 bgcolor=#E9E9E9
| 345042 ||  || — || March 12, 2005 || Socorro || LINEAR || — || align=right | 2.6 km || 
|-id=043 bgcolor=#E9E9E9
| 345043 ||  || — || March 11, 2005 || Mount Lemmon || Mount Lemmon Survey || — || align=right | 1.9 km || 
|-id=044 bgcolor=#E9E9E9
| 345044 ||  || — || March 9, 2005 || Catalina || CSS || — || align=right | 2.4 km || 
|-id=045 bgcolor=#d6d6d6
| 345045 ||  || — || March 9, 2005 || Mount Lemmon || Mount Lemmon Survey || BRA || align=right | 1.6 km || 
|-id=046 bgcolor=#E9E9E9
| 345046 ||  || — || March 30, 2005 || Catalina || CSS || — || align=right | 2.5 km || 
|-id=047 bgcolor=#E9E9E9
| 345047 ||  || — || April 1, 2005 || Catalina || CSS || — || align=right | 1.5 km || 
|-id=048 bgcolor=#E9E9E9
| 345048 ||  || — || April 4, 2005 || Mount Lemmon || Mount Lemmon Survey || — || align=right | 2.4 km || 
|-id=049 bgcolor=#E9E9E9
| 345049 ||  || — || April 5, 2005 || Mount Lemmon || Mount Lemmon Survey || — || align=right | 1.4 km || 
|-id=050 bgcolor=#E9E9E9
| 345050 ||  || — || April 5, 2005 || Mount Lemmon || Mount Lemmon Survey || AGN || align=right | 1.2 km || 
|-id=051 bgcolor=#d6d6d6
| 345051 ||  || — || April 4, 2005 || Mount Lemmon || Mount Lemmon Survey || — || align=right | 2.7 km || 
|-id=052 bgcolor=#E9E9E9
| 345052 ||  || — || April 4, 2005 || Mount Lemmon || Mount Lemmon Survey || — || align=right | 2.1 km || 
|-id=053 bgcolor=#FA8072
| 345053 ||  || — || April 9, 2005 || Kitt Peak || Spacewatch || — || align=right data-sort-value="0.97" | 970 m || 
|-id=054 bgcolor=#E9E9E9
| 345054 ||  || — || November 20, 2003 || Kitt Peak || Spacewatch || MRX || align=right | 1.0 km || 
|-id=055 bgcolor=#d6d6d6
| 345055 ||  || — || April 10, 2005 || Mount Lemmon || Mount Lemmon Survey || K-2 || align=right | 1.3 km || 
|-id=056 bgcolor=#E9E9E9
| 345056 ||  || — || April 11, 2005 || Socorro || LINEAR || — || align=right | 2.7 km || 
|-id=057 bgcolor=#E9E9E9
| 345057 ||  || — || April 7, 2005 || Kitt Peak || Spacewatch || — || align=right | 2.4 km || 
|-id=058 bgcolor=#d6d6d6
| 345058 ||  || — || April 7, 2005 || Kitt Peak || Spacewatch || — || align=right | 3.3 km || 
|-id=059 bgcolor=#E9E9E9
| 345059 ||  || — || April 10, 2005 || Kitt Peak || Spacewatch || AGN || align=right | 1.4 km || 
|-id=060 bgcolor=#d6d6d6
| 345060 ||  || — || March 15, 2005 || Mount Lemmon || Mount Lemmon Survey || — || align=right | 2.8 km || 
|-id=061 bgcolor=#d6d6d6
| 345061 ||  || — || April 10, 2005 || Mount Lemmon || Mount Lemmon Survey || — || align=right | 2.9 km || 
|-id=062 bgcolor=#d6d6d6
| 345062 ||  || — || April 11, 2005 || Mount Lemmon || Mount Lemmon Survey || — || align=right | 2.4 km || 
|-id=063 bgcolor=#d6d6d6
| 345063 ||  || — || April 2, 2005 || Mount Lemmon || Mount Lemmon Survey || — || align=right | 2.6 km || 
|-id=064 bgcolor=#d6d6d6
| 345064 ||  || — || March 16, 2005 || Mount Lemmon || Mount Lemmon Survey || — || align=right | 3.3 km || 
|-id=065 bgcolor=#d6d6d6
| 345065 ||  || — || April 10, 2005 || Mount Lemmon || Mount Lemmon Survey || EUP || align=right | 3.1 km || 
|-id=066 bgcolor=#E9E9E9
| 345066 ||  || — || May 3, 2005 || Junk Bond || Junk Bond Obs. || — || align=right | 2.6 km || 
|-id=067 bgcolor=#d6d6d6
| 345067 ||  || — || May 3, 2005 || Kitt Peak || Spacewatch || — || align=right | 4.5 km || 
|-id=068 bgcolor=#d6d6d6
| 345068 ||  || — || May 3, 2005 || Socorro || LINEAR || — || align=right | 3.6 km || 
|-id=069 bgcolor=#d6d6d6
| 345069 ||  || — || May 4, 2005 || Mount Lemmon || Mount Lemmon Survey || — || align=right | 2.7 km || 
|-id=070 bgcolor=#d6d6d6
| 345070 ||  || — || May 8, 2005 || Kitt Peak || Spacewatch || — || align=right | 5.5 km || 
|-id=071 bgcolor=#d6d6d6
| 345071 ||  || — || May 3, 2005 || Kitt Peak || Spacewatch || — || align=right | 2.8 km || 
|-id=072 bgcolor=#d6d6d6
| 345072 ||  || — || May 4, 2005 || Kitt Peak || Spacewatch || KOR || align=right | 1.4 km || 
|-id=073 bgcolor=#fefefe
| 345073 ||  || — || May 4, 2005 || Kitt Peak || Spacewatch || — || align=right data-sort-value="0.98" | 980 m || 
|-id=074 bgcolor=#d6d6d6
| 345074 ||  || — || May 6, 2005 || Kitt Peak || Spacewatch || TIR || align=right | 3.3 km || 
|-id=075 bgcolor=#d6d6d6
| 345075 ||  || — || April 11, 2005 || Mount Lemmon || Mount Lemmon Survey || — || align=right | 2.3 km || 
|-id=076 bgcolor=#E9E9E9
| 345076 ||  || — || May 9, 2005 || Mount Lemmon || Mount Lemmon Survey || ADE || align=right | 2.0 km || 
|-id=077 bgcolor=#d6d6d6
| 345077 ||  || — || May 9, 2005 || Kitt Peak || Spacewatch || EOS || align=right | 2.3 km || 
|-id=078 bgcolor=#d6d6d6
| 345078 ||  || — || May 14, 2005 || Mount Lemmon || Mount Lemmon Survey || — || align=right | 2.2 km || 
|-id=079 bgcolor=#d6d6d6
| 345079 ||  || — || May 14, 2005 || Kitt Peak || Spacewatch || URS || align=right | 3.8 km || 
|-id=080 bgcolor=#d6d6d6
| 345080 ||  || — || August 26, 2000 || Kitt Peak || Spacewatch || LIX || align=right | 3.3 km || 
|-id=081 bgcolor=#d6d6d6
| 345081 ||  || — || May 4, 2005 || Kitt Peak || Spacewatch || — || align=right | 3.4 km || 
|-id=082 bgcolor=#d6d6d6
| 345082 ||  || — || May 16, 2005 || Mount Lemmon || Mount Lemmon Survey || — || align=right | 2.5 km || 
|-id=083 bgcolor=#d6d6d6
| 345083 ||  || — || May 17, 2005 || Mount Lemmon || Mount Lemmon Survey || — || align=right | 3.8 km || 
|-id=084 bgcolor=#d6d6d6
| 345084 ||  || — || June 3, 2005 || Kitt Peak || Spacewatch || EOS || align=right | 2.5 km || 
|-id=085 bgcolor=#E9E9E9
| 345085 ||  || — || June 6, 2005 || Kitt Peak || Spacewatch || — || align=right | 3.7 km || 
|-id=086 bgcolor=#d6d6d6
| 345086 ||  || — || June 8, 2005 || Kitt Peak || Spacewatch || — || align=right | 3.1 km || 
|-id=087 bgcolor=#d6d6d6
| 345087 ||  || — || June 11, 2005 || Kitt Peak || Spacewatch || — || align=right | 3.1 km || 
|-id=088 bgcolor=#d6d6d6
| 345088 ||  || — || June 16, 2005 || Mount Lemmon || Mount Lemmon Survey || — || align=right | 3.5 km || 
|-id=089 bgcolor=#d6d6d6
| 345089 ||  || — || June 27, 2005 || Kitt Peak || Spacewatch || — || align=right | 3.3 km || 
|-id=090 bgcolor=#fefefe
| 345090 ||  || — || June 18, 2005 || Mount Lemmon || Mount Lemmon Survey || — || align=right data-sort-value="0.90" | 900 m || 
|-id=091 bgcolor=#d6d6d6
| 345091 ||  || — || June 29, 2005 || Kitt Peak || Spacewatch || — || align=right | 2.5 km || 
|-id=092 bgcolor=#fefefe
| 345092 ||  || — || June 30, 2005 || Palomar || NEAT || — || align=right data-sort-value="0.70" | 700 m || 
|-id=093 bgcolor=#d6d6d6
| 345093 ||  || — || June 29, 2005 || Kitt Peak || Spacewatch || — || align=right | 4.2 km || 
|-id=094 bgcolor=#fefefe
| 345094 ||  || — || June 30, 2005 || Kitt Peak || Spacewatch || — || align=right data-sort-value="0.68" | 680 m || 
|-id=095 bgcolor=#fefefe
| 345095 ||  || — || June 30, 2005 || Kitt Peak || Spacewatch || — || align=right data-sort-value="0.80" | 800 m || 
|-id=096 bgcolor=#fefefe
| 345096 ||  || — || June 30, 2005 || Kitt Peak || Spacewatch || — || align=right data-sort-value="0.62" | 620 m || 
|-id=097 bgcolor=#FA8072
| 345097 ||  || — || July 2, 2005 || Catalina || CSS || — || align=right data-sort-value="0.86" | 860 m || 
|-id=098 bgcolor=#d6d6d6
| 345098 ||  || — || July 3, 2005 || Mount Lemmon || Mount Lemmon Survey || — || align=right | 3.0 km || 
|-id=099 bgcolor=#fefefe
| 345099 ||  || — || July 4, 2005 || Palomar || NEAT || — || align=right data-sort-value="0.90" | 900 m || 
|-id=100 bgcolor=#d6d6d6
| 345100 ||  || — || July 4, 2005 || Kitt Peak || Spacewatch || — || align=right | 3.5 km || 
|}

345101–345200 

|-bgcolor=#d6d6d6
| 345101 ||  || — || July 5, 2005 || Kitt Peak || Spacewatch || — || align=right | 3.3 km || 
|-id=102 bgcolor=#d6d6d6
| 345102 ||  || — || June 18, 2005 || Mount Lemmon || Mount Lemmon Survey || VER || align=right | 3.2 km || 
|-id=103 bgcolor=#fefefe
| 345103 ||  || — || July 7, 2005 || Campo Imperatore || CINEOS || — || align=right data-sort-value="0.82" | 820 m || 
|-id=104 bgcolor=#FA8072
| 345104 ||  || — || July 4, 2005 || Palomar || NEAT || — || align=right data-sort-value="0.78" | 780 m || 
|-id=105 bgcolor=#fefefe
| 345105 ||  || — || July 5, 2005 || Palomar || NEAT || FLO || align=right data-sort-value="0.56" | 560 m || 
|-id=106 bgcolor=#FA8072
| 345106 ||  || — || July 27, 2005 || Palomar || NEAT || — || align=right | 1.0 km || 
|-id=107 bgcolor=#fefefe
| 345107 ||  || — || July 29, 2005 || Palomar || NEAT || FLO || align=right data-sort-value="0.68" | 680 m || 
|-id=108 bgcolor=#fefefe
| 345108 ||  || — || August 7, 2005 || Needville || J. Dellinger || — || align=right data-sort-value="0.83" | 830 m || 
|-id=109 bgcolor=#fefefe
| 345109 ||  || — || July 18, 2005 || Palomar || NEAT || — || align=right data-sort-value="0.86" | 860 m || 
|-id=110 bgcolor=#fefefe
| 345110 ||  || — || August 24, 2005 || Palomar || NEAT || V || align=right data-sort-value="0.93" | 930 m || 
|-id=111 bgcolor=#fefefe
| 345111 ||  || — || August 25, 2005 || Palomar || NEAT || FLO || align=right data-sort-value="0.68" | 680 m || 
|-id=112 bgcolor=#fefefe
| 345112 ||  || — || August 25, 2005 || Palomar || NEAT || — || align=right data-sort-value="0.77" | 770 m || 
|-id=113 bgcolor=#fefefe
| 345113 ||  || — || August 25, 2005 || Palomar || NEAT || FLO || align=right data-sort-value="0.73" | 730 m || 
|-id=114 bgcolor=#fefefe
| 345114 ||  || — || August 25, 2005 || Palomar || NEAT || — || align=right | 1.1 km || 
|-id=115 bgcolor=#fefefe
| 345115 ||  || — || August 26, 2005 || Palomar || NEAT || FLO || align=right data-sort-value="0.94" | 940 m || 
|-id=116 bgcolor=#fefefe
| 345116 ||  || — || August 26, 2005 || Anderson Mesa || LONEOS || FLO || align=right data-sort-value="0.64" | 640 m || 
|-id=117 bgcolor=#fefefe
| 345117 ||  || — || August 27, 2005 || Needville || Needville Obs. || — || align=right data-sort-value="0.90" | 900 m || 
|-id=118 bgcolor=#fefefe
| 345118 ||  || — || August 25, 2005 || Palomar || NEAT || NYS || align=right data-sort-value="0.76" | 760 m || 
|-id=119 bgcolor=#fefefe
| 345119 ||  || — || August 26, 2005 || Palomar || NEAT || FLO || align=right data-sort-value="0.73" | 730 m || 
|-id=120 bgcolor=#fefefe
| 345120 ||  || — || August 29, 2005 || Anderson Mesa || LONEOS || — || align=right | 1.2 km || 
|-id=121 bgcolor=#d6d6d6
| 345121 ||  || — || August 27, 2005 || Palomar || NEAT || HYG || align=right | 5.2 km || 
|-id=122 bgcolor=#fefefe
| 345122 ||  || — || August 27, 2005 || Palomar || NEAT || — || align=right data-sort-value="0.76" | 760 m || 
|-id=123 bgcolor=#fefefe
| 345123 ||  || — || August 28, 2005 || Kitt Peak || Spacewatch || — || align=right data-sort-value="0.85" | 850 m || 
|-id=124 bgcolor=#FA8072
| 345124 ||  || — || August 30, 2005 || Anderson Mesa || LONEOS || — || align=right data-sort-value="0.72" | 720 m || 
|-id=125 bgcolor=#fefefe
| 345125 ||  || — || August 30, 2005 || Palomar || NEAT || FLO || align=right data-sort-value="0.80" | 800 m || 
|-id=126 bgcolor=#fefefe
| 345126 ||  || — || July 29, 2005 || Palomar || NEAT || — || align=right data-sort-value="0.86" | 860 m || 
|-id=127 bgcolor=#fefefe
| 345127 ||  || — || August 31, 2005 || Palomar || NEAT || V || align=right data-sort-value="0.87" | 870 m || 
|-id=128 bgcolor=#fefefe
| 345128 ||  || — || August 29, 2005 || Palomar || NEAT || FLO || align=right data-sort-value="0.83" | 830 m || 
|-id=129 bgcolor=#fefefe
| 345129 ||  || — || August 29, 2005 || Palomar || NEAT || — || align=right data-sort-value="0.82" | 820 m || 
|-id=130 bgcolor=#FA8072
| 345130 ||  || — || September 13, 2005 || Socorro || LINEAR || — || align=right data-sort-value="0.66" | 660 m || 
|-id=131 bgcolor=#FA8072
| 345131 ||  || — || September 23, 2005 || Kitt Peak || Spacewatch || — || align=right data-sort-value="0.68" | 680 m || 
|-id=132 bgcolor=#fefefe
| 345132 ||  || — || September 23, 2005 || Catalina || CSS || — || align=right data-sort-value="0.98" | 980 m || 
|-id=133 bgcolor=#fefefe
| 345133 ||  || — || September 24, 2005 || Altschwendt || W. Ries || — || align=right | 1.2 km || 
|-id=134 bgcolor=#fefefe
| 345134 ||  || — || September 23, 2005 || Catalina || CSS || — || align=right data-sort-value="0.98" | 980 m || 
|-id=135 bgcolor=#fefefe
| 345135 ||  || — || September 23, 2005 || Kitt Peak || Spacewatch || — || align=right data-sort-value="0.89" | 890 m || 
|-id=136 bgcolor=#fefefe
| 345136 ||  || — || September 24, 2005 || Kitt Peak || Spacewatch || — || align=right data-sort-value="0.84" | 840 m || 
|-id=137 bgcolor=#fefefe
| 345137 ||  || — || September 24, 2005 || Kitt Peak || Spacewatch || V || align=right data-sort-value="0.55" | 550 m || 
|-id=138 bgcolor=#fefefe
| 345138 ||  || — || September 24, 2005 || Kitt Peak || Spacewatch || — || align=right data-sort-value="0.98" | 980 m || 
|-id=139 bgcolor=#fefefe
| 345139 ||  || — || September 24, 2005 || Kitt Peak || Spacewatch || V || align=right data-sort-value="0.68" | 680 m || 
|-id=140 bgcolor=#fefefe
| 345140 ||  || — || September 25, 2005 || Catalina || CSS || — || align=right data-sort-value="0.94" | 940 m || 
|-id=141 bgcolor=#fefefe
| 345141 ||  || — || September 25, 2005 || Kitt Peak || Spacewatch || — || align=right | 1.2 km || 
|-id=142 bgcolor=#fefefe
| 345142 ||  || — || September 25, 2005 || Kitt Peak || Spacewatch || — || align=right data-sort-value="0.75" | 750 m || 
|-id=143 bgcolor=#fefefe
| 345143 ||  || — || September 23, 2005 || Kitt Peak || Spacewatch || — || align=right | 1.1 km || 
|-id=144 bgcolor=#fefefe
| 345144 ||  || — || September 24, 2005 || Kitt Peak || Spacewatch || V || align=right data-sort-value="0.74" | 740 m || 
|-id=145 bgcolor=#fefefe
| 345145 ||  || — || September 24, 2005 || Kitt Peak || Spacewatch || V || align=right data-sort-value="0.65" | 650 m || 
|-id=146 bgcolor=#fefefe
| 345146 ||  || — || September 25, 2005 || Kitt Peak || Spacewatch || FLO || align=right data-sort-value="0.73" | 730 m || 
|-id=147 bgcolor=#fefefe
| 345147 ||  || — || September 26, 2005 || Kitt Peak || Spacewatch || — || align=right data-sort-value="0.81" | 810 m || 
|-id=148 bgcolor=#fefefe
| 345148 ||  || — || September 26, 2005 || Kitt Peak || Spacewatch || — || align=right | 1.1 km || 
|-id=149 bgcolor=#fefefe
| 345149 ||  || — || September 27, 2005 || Kitt Peak || Spacewatch || — || align=right | 1.0 km || 
|-id=150 bgcolor=#fefefe
| 345150 ||  || — || September 29, 2005 || Kitt Peak || Spacewatch || — || align=right data-sort-value="0.92" | 920 m || 
|-id=151 bgcolor=#fefefe
| 345151 ||  || — || September 29, 2005 || Anderson Mesa || LONEOS || — || align=right data-sort-value="0.78" | 780 m || 
|-id=152 bgcolor=#fefefe
| 345152 ||  || — || September 29, 2005 || Anderson Mesa || LONEOS || — || align=right data-sort-value="0.81" | 810 m || 
|-id=153 bgcolor=#fefefe
| 345153 ||  || — || September 29, 2005 || Mount Lemmon || Mount Lemmon Survey || V || align=right data-sort-value="0.90" | 900 m || 
|-id=154 bgcolor=#fefefe
| 345154 ||  || — || September 29, 2005 || Kitt Peak || Spacewatch || — || align=right data-sort-value="0.75" | 750 m || 
|-id=155 bgcolor=#fefefe
| 345155 ||  || — || September 28, 2005 || Palomar || NEAT || — || align=right | 1.0 km || 
|-id=156 bgcolor=#fefefe
| 345156 ||  || — || September 28, 2005 || Palomar || NEAT || FLO || align=right data-sort-value="0.90" | 900 m || 
|-id=157 bgcolor=#fefefe
| 345157 ||  || — || September 29, 2005 || Kitt Peak || Spacewatch || V || align=right data-sort-value="0.75" | 750 m || 
|-id=158 bgcolor=#fefefe
| 345158 ||  || — || September 29, 2005 || Kitt Peak || Spacewatch || — || align=right data-sort-value="0.91" | 910 m || 
|-id=159 bgcolor=#fefefe
| 345159 ||  || — || September 11, 2005 || Socorro || LINEAR || — || align=right data-sort-value="0.94" | 940 m || 
|-id=160 bgcolor=#fefefe
| 345160 ||  || — || September 30, 2005 || Anderson Mesa || LONEOS || — || align=right data-sort-value="0.87" | 870 m || 
|-id=161 bgcolor=#fefefe
| 345161 ||  || — || August 26, 2005 || Palomar || NEAT || — || align=right | 1.1 km || 
|-id=162 bgcolor=#d6d6d6
| 345162 ||  || — || September 29, 2005 || Mount Lemmon || Mount Lemmon Survey || 7:4 || align=right | 3.5 km || 
|-id=163 bgcolor=#fefefe
| 345163 ||  || — || September 29, 2005 || Kitt Peak || Spacewatch || — || align=right data-sort-value="0.77" | 770 m || 
|-id=164 bgcolor=#fefefe
| 345164 ||  || — || September 30, 2005 || Mount Lemmon || Mount Lemmon Survey || NYS || align=right data-sort-value="0.70" | 700 m || 
|-id=165 bgcolor=#fefefe
| 345165 ||  || — || September 22, 2005 || Palomar || NEAT || — || align=right | 1.00 km || 
|-id=166 bgcolor=#fefefe
| 345166 ||  || — || September 23, 2005 || Kitt Peak || Spacewatch || — || align=right data-sort-value="0.78" | 780 m || 
|-id=167 bgcolor=#fefefe
| 345167 ||  || — || September 27, 2005 || Palomar || NEAT || — || align=right data-sort-value="0.83" | 830 m || 
|-id=168 bgcolor=#fefefe
| 345168 ||  || — || September 30, 2005 || Anderson Mesa || LONEOS || — || align=right data-sort-value="0.88" | 880 m || 
|-id=169 bgcolor=#fefefe
| 345169 ||  || — || September 29, 2005 || Mount Lemmon || Mount Lemmon Survey || — || align=right data-sort-value="0.82" | 820 m || 
|-id=170 bgcolor=#d6d6d6
| 345170 ||  || — || September 25, 2005 || Apache Point || A. C. Becker || 7:4 || align=right | 4.4 km || 
|-id=171 bgcolor=#fefefe
| 345171 ||  || — || October 1, 2005 || Socorro || LINEAR || FLO || align=right data-sort-value="0.70" | 700 m || 
|-id=172 bgcolor=#fefefe
| 345172 ||  || — || October 2, 2005 || Mount Lemmon || Mount Lemmon Survey || — || align=right data-sort-value="0.78" | 780 m || 
|-id=173 bgcolor=#fefefe
| 345173 ||  || — || October 1, 2005 || Mount Lemmon || Mount Lemmon Survey || — || align=right | 1.0 km || 
|-id=174 bgcolor=#fefefe
| 345174 ||  || — || October 2, 2005 || Mount Lemmon || Mount Lemmon Survey || — || align=right data-sort-value="0.85" | 850 m || 
|-id=175 bgcolor=#fefefe
| 345175 ||  || — || October 2, 2005 || Palomar || NEAT || — || align=right data-sort-value="0.88" | 880 m || 
|-id=176 bgcolor=#fefefe
| 345176 ||  || — || October 3, 2005 || Catalina || CSS || — || align=right data-sort-value="0.86" | 860 m || 
|-id=177 bgcolor=#fefefe
| 345177 ||  || — || October 7, 2005 || Anderson Mesa || LONEOS || — || align=right | 1.1 km || 
|-id=178 bgcolor=#fefefe
| 345178 ||  || — || October 1, 2005 || Catalina || CSS || FLO || align=right data-sort-value="0.91" | 910 m || 
|-id=179 bgcolor=#d6d6d6
| 345179 ||  || — || October 7, 2005 || Mount Lemmon || Mount Lemmon Survey || 7:4 || align=right | 4.7 km || 
|-id=180 bgcolor=#fefefe
| 345180 ||  || — || October 3, 2005 || Kitt Peak || Spacewatch || FLO || align=right data-sort-value="0.60" | 600 m || 
|-id=181 bgcolor=#fefefe
| 345181 ||  || — || September 25, 2005 || Kitt Peak || Spacewatch || V || align=right data-sort-value="0.64" | 640 m || 
|-id=182 bgcolor=#fefefe
| 345182 ||  || — || October 6, 2005 || Mount Lemmon || Mount Lemmon Survey || — || align=right | 1.0 km || 
|-id=183 bgcolor=#fefefe
| 345183 ||  || — || October 7, 2005 || Catalina || CSS || — || align=right data-sort-value="0.94" | 940 m || 
|-id=184 bgcolor=#fefefe
| 345184 ||  || — || September 29, 2005 || Kitt Peak || Spacewatch || — || align=right data-sort-value="0.99" | 990 m || 
|-id=185 bgcolor=#fefefe
| 345185 ||  || — || October 7, 2005 || Kitt Peak || Spacewatch || — || align=right data-sort-value="0.76" | 760 m || 
|-id=186 bgcolor=#fefefe
| 345186 ||  || — || October 9, 2005 || Kitt Peak || Spacewatch || NYS || align=right data-sort-value="0.76" | 760 m || 
|-id=187 bgcolor=#fefefe
| 345187 ||  || — || October 10, 2005 || Anderson Mesa || LONEOS || — || align=right | 1.3 km || 
|-id=188 bgcolor=#fefefe
| 345188 ||  || — || October 23, 1995 || Kitt Peak || Spacewatch || — || align=right data-sort-value="0.86" | 860 m || 
|-id=189 bgcolor=#fefefe
| 345189 ||  || — || October 5, 2005 || Catalina || CSS || — || align=right | 1.1 km || 
|-id=190 bgcolor=#fefefe
| 345190 ||  || — || October 22, 2005 || Kitt Peak || Spacewatch || — || align=right data-sort-value="0.86" | 860 m || 
|-id=191 bgcolor=#fefefe
| 345191 ||  || — || October 23, 2005 || Kitt Peak || Spacewatch || V || align=right data-sort-value="0.78" | 780 m || 
|-id=192 bgcolor=#fefefe
| 345192 ||  || — || October 23, 2005 || Kitt Peak || Spacewatch || — || align=right data-sort-value="0.75" | 750 m || 
|-id=193 bgcolor=#fefefe
| 345193 ||  || — || October 23, 2005 || Kitt Peak || Spacewatch || MAS || align=right data-sort-value="0.80" | 800 m || 
|-id=194 bgcolor=#fefefe
| 345194 ||  || — || October 23, 2005 || Catalina || CSS || NYS || align=right data-sort-value="0.75" | 750 m || 
|-id=195 bgcolor=#fefefe
| 345195 ||  || — || October 24, 2005 || Kitt Peak || Spacewatch || V || align=right data-sort-value="0.74" | 740 m || 
|-id=196 bgcolor=#fefefe
| 345196 ||  || — || September 30, 2005 || Mount Lemmon || Mount Lemmon Survey || V || align=right data-sort-value="0.59" | 590 m || 
|-id=197 bgcolor=#fefefe
| 345197 ||  || — || October 23, 2005 || Catalina || CSS || NYS || align=right data-sort-value="0.83" | 830 m || 
|-id=198 bgcolor=#fefefe
| 345198 ||  || — || October 23, 2005 || Catalina || CSS || V || align=right data-sort-value="0.85" | 850 m || 
|-id=199 bgcolor=#fefefe
| 345199 ||  || — || October 23, 2005 || Catalina || CSS || FLO || align=right data-sort-value="0.70" | 700 m || 
|-id=200 bgcolor=#fefefe
| 345200 ||  || — || October 25, 2005 || Mount Lemmon || Mount Lemmon Survey || — || align=right | 1.0 km || 
|}

345201–345300 

|-bgcolor=#fefefe
| 345201 ||  || — || October 20, 2005 || Palomar || NEAT || — || align=right | 1.0 km || 
|-id=202 bgcolor=#fefefe
| 345202 ||  || — || October 23, 2005 || Catalina || CSS || FLO || align=right data-sort-value="0.67" | 670 m || 
|-id=203 bgcolor=#fefefe
| 345203 ||  || — || October 24, 2005 || Kitt Peak || Spacewatch || — || align=right | 1.2 km || 
|-id=204 bgcolor=#fefefe
| 345204 ||  || — || October 22, 2005 || Kitt Peak || Spacewatch || NYS || align=right data-sort-value="0.69" | 690 m || 
|-id=205 bgcolor=#fefefe
| 345205 ||  || — || October 22, 2005 || Kitt Peak || Spacewatch || FLO || align=right data-sort-value="0.73" | 730 m || 
|-id=206 bgcolor=#fefefe
| 345206 ||  || — || October 22, 2005 || Kitt Peak || Spacewatch || — || align=right | 1.0 km || 
|-id=207 bgcolor=#fefefe
| 345207 ||  || — || October 22, 2005 || Kitt Peak || Spacewatch || — || align=right data-sort-value="0.98" | 980 m || 
|-id=208 bgcolor=#fefefe
| 345208 ||  || — || October 22, 2005 || Kitt Peak || Spacewatch || — || align=right data-sort-value="0.86" | 860 m || 
|-id=209 bgcolor=#fefefe
| 345209 ||  || — || October 22, 2005 || Kitt Peak || Spacewatch || — || align=right | 1.0 km || 
|-id=210 bgcolor=#fefefe
| 345210 ||  || — || October 22, 2005 || Kitt Peak || Spacewatch || NYS || align=right data-sort-value="0.76" | 760 m || 
|-id=211 bgcolor=#fefefe
| 345211 ||  || — || October 22, 2005 || Kitt Peak || Spacewatch || — || align=right | 1.2 km || 
|-id=212 bgcolor=#fefefe
| 345212 ||  || — || October 22, 2005 || Kitt Peak || Spacewatch || NYS || align=right data-sort-value="0.58" | 580 m || 
|-id=213 bgcolor=#fefefe
| 345213 ||  || — || October 22, 2005 || Kitt Peak || Spacewatch || — || align=right data-sort-value="0.90" | 900 m || 
|-id=214 bgcolor=#fefefe
| 345214 ||  || — || October 22, 2005 || Catalina || CSS || FLO || align=right | 1.00 km || 
|-id=215 bgcolor=#fefefe
| 345215 ||  || — || October 23, 2005 || Palomar || NEAT || FLO || align=right data-sort-value="0.73" | 730 m || 
|-id=216 bgcolor=#fefefe
| 345216 ||  || — || October 23, 2005 || Catalina || CSS || — || align=right | 1.1 km || 
|-id=217 bgcolor=#fefefe
| 345217 ||  || — || October 25, 2005 || Mount Lemmon || Mount Lemmon Survey || — || align=right data-sort-value="0.65" | 650 m || 
|-id=218 bgcolor=#fefefe
| 345218 ||  || — || October 26, 2005 || Kitt Peak || Spacewatch || NYS || align=right data-sort-value="0.58" | 580 m || 
|-id=219 bgcolor=#fefefe
| 345219 ||  || — || October 27, 2005 || Kitt Peak || Spacewatch || — || align=right data-sort-value="0.87" | 870 m || 
|-id=220 bgcolor=#fefefe
| 345220 ||  || — || October 29, 2005 || Eskridge || Farpoint Obs. || MAS || align=right data-sort-value="0.76" | 760 m || 
|-id=221 bgcolor=#fefefe
| 345221 ||  || — || October 23, 2005 || Kitt Peak || Spacewatch || — || align=right data-sort-value="0.80" | 800 m || 
|-id=222 bgcolor=#fefefe
| 345222 ||  || — || October 24, 2005 || Kitt Peak || Spacewatch || FLO || align=right data-sort-value="0.68" | 680 m || 
|-id=223 bgcolor=#fefefe
| 345223 ||  || — || October 24, 2005 || Kitt Peak || Spacewatch || NYS || align=right data-sort-value="0.68" | 680 m || 
|-id=224 bgcolor=#fefefe
| 345224 ||  || — || October 24, 2005 || Kitt Peak || Spacewatch || MAS || align=right data-sort-value="0.72" | 720 m || 
|-id=225 bgcolor=#fefefe
| 345225 ||  || — || October 24, 2005 || Kitt Peak || Spacewatch || — || align=right data-sort-value="0.89" | 890 m || 
|-id=226 bgcolor=#d6d6d6
| 345226 ||  || — || October 27, 2005 || Mount Lemmon || Mount Lemmon Survey || SHU3:2 || align=right | 6.0 km || 
|-id=227 bgcolor=#fefefe
| 345227 ||  || — || October 22, 2005 || Kitt Peak || Spacewatch || NYS || align=right data-sort-value="0.72" | 720 m || 
|-id=228 bgcolor=#fefefe
| 345228 ||  || — || October 25, 2005 || Kitt Peak || Spacewatch || — || align=right data-sort-value="0.91" | 910 m || 
|-id=229 bgcolor=#fefefe
| 345229 ||  || — || October 26, 2005 || Kitt Peak || Spacewatch || — || align=right | 1.00 km || 
|-id=230 bgcolor=#fefefe
| 345230 ||  || — || October 26, 2005 || Anderson Mesa || LONEOS || — || align=right data-sort-value="0.97" | 970 m || 
|-id=231 bgcolor=#fefefe
| 345231 ||  || — || October 27, 2005 || Palomar || NEAT || V || align=right data-sort-value="0.68" | 680 m || 
|-id=232 bgcolor=#fefefe
| 345232 ||  || — || October 27, 2005 || Palomar || NEAT || — || align=right data-sort-value="0.98" | 980 m || 
|-id=233 bgcolor=#fefefe
| 345233 ||  || — || October 25, 2005 || Catalina || CSS || V || align=right data-sort-value="0.94" | 940 m || 
|-id=234 bgcolor=#fefefe
| 345234 ||  || — || October 25, 2005 || Catalina || CSS || V || align=right data-sort-value="0.89" | 890 m || 
|-id=235 bgcolor=#fefefe
| 345235 ||  || — || October 25, 2005 || Kitt Peak || Spacewatch || FLO || align=right data-sort-value="0.60" | 600 m || 
|-id=236 bgcolor=#fefefe
| 345236 ||  || — || October 25, 2005 || Kitt Peak || Spacewatch || NYS || align=right data-sort-value="0.72" | 720 m || 
|-id=237 bgcolor=#fefefe
| 345237 ||  || — || October 25, 2005 || Kitt Peak || Spacewatch || — || align=right data-sort-value="0.92" | 920 m || 
|-id=238 bgcolor=#fefefe
| 345238 ||  || — || October 28, 2005 || Mount Lemmon || Mount Lemmon Survey || FLO || align=right data-sort-value="0.83" | 830 m || 
|-id=239 bgcolor=#fefefe
| 345239 ||  || — || October 26, 2005 || Anderson Mesa || LONEOS || — || align=right | 1.1 km || 
|-id=240 bgcolor=#d6d6d6
| 345240 ||  || — || October 27, 2005 || Kitt Peak || Spacewatch || SHU3:2 || align=right | 5.3 km || 
|-id=241 bgcolor=#fefefe
| 345241 ||  || — || October 24, 2005 || Kitt Peak || Spacewatch || — || align=right data-sort-value="0.80" | 800 m || 
|-id=242 bgcolor=#fefefe
| 345242 ||  || — || October 26, 2005 || Kitt Peak || Spacewatch || — || align=right data-sort-value="0.91" | 910 m || 
|-id=243 bgcolor=#fefefe
| 345243 ||  || — || October 26, 2005 || Kitt Peak || Spacewatch || NYS || align=right data-sort-value="0.57" | 570 m || 
|-id=244 bgcolor=#fefefe
| 345244 ||  || — || October 26, 2005 || Kitt Peak || Spacewatch || FLO || align=right data-sort-value="0.70" | 700 m || 
|-id=245 bgcolor=#fefefe
| 345245 ||  || — || October 27, 2005 || Mount Lemmon || Mount Lemmon Survey || — || align=right data-sort-value="0.82" | 820 m || 
|-id=246 bgcolor=#fefefe
| 345246 ||  || — || October 28, 2005 || Catalina || CSS || FLO || align=right data-sort-value="0.92" | 920 m || 
|-id=247 bgcolor=#fefefe
| 345247 ||  || — || October 31, 2005 || Mount Lemmon || Mount Lemmon Survey || — || align=right data-sort-value="0.74" | 740 m || 
|-id=248 bgcolor=#fefefe
| 345248 ||  || — || October 31, 2005 || Mount Lemmon || Mount Lemmon Survey || NYS || align=right | 1.8 km || 
|-id=249 bgcolor=#fefefe
| 345249 ||  || — || October 28, 2005 || Kitt Peak || Spacewatch || — || align=right data-sort-value="0.75" | 750 m || 
|-id=250 bgcolor=#fefefe
| 345250 ||  || — || October 29, 2005 || Catalina || CSS || V || align=right data-sort-value="0.84" | 840 m || 
|-id=251 bgcolor=#fefefe
| 345251 ||  || — || October 28, 2005 || Mount Lemmon || Mount Lemmon Survey || V || align=right data-sort-value="0.79" | 790 m || 
|-id=252 bgcolor=#fefefe
| 345252 ||  || — || October 30, 2005 || Palomar || NEAT || — || align=right | 1.3 km || 
|-id=253 bgcolor=#fefefe
| 345253 ||  || — || October 30, 2005 || Kitt Peak || Spacewatch || V || align=right data-sort-value="0.63" | 630 m || 
|-id=254 bgcolor=#fefefe
| 345254 ||  || — || October 26, 2005 || Anderson Mesa || LONEOS || V || align=right data-sort-value="0.74" | 740 m || 
|-id=255 bgcolor=#fefefe
| 345255 ||  || — || October 31, 2005 || Anderson Mesa || LONEOS || — || align=right | 1.1 km || 
|-id=256 bgcolor=#fefefe
| 345256 ||  || — || November 4, 2005 || Kitt Peak || Spacewatch || V || align=right data-sort-value="0.59" | 590 m || 
|-id=257 bgcolor=#fefefe
| 345257 ||  || — || November 6, 2005 || Kitt Peak || Spacewatch || — || align=right data-sort-value="0.82" | 820 m || 
|-id=258 bgcolor=#fefefe
| 345258 ||  || — || November 1, 2005 || Kitt Peak || Spacewatch || — || align=right data-sort-value="0.65" | 650 m || 
|-id=259 bgcolor=#fefefe
| 345259 ||  || — || November 4, 2005 || Mount Lemmon || Mount Lemmon Survey || — || align=right | 1.1 km || 
|-id=260 bgcolor=#fefefe
| 345260 ||  || — || November 2, 2005 || Socorro || LINEAR || V || align=right data-sort-value="0.69" | 690 m || 
|-id=261 bgcolor=#fefefe
| 345261 ||  || — || October 29, 2005 || Catalina || CSS || FLO || align=right data-sort-value="0.76" | 760 m || 
|-id=262 bgcolor=#fefefe
| 345262 ||  || — || November 4, 2005 || Kitt Peak || Spacewatch || NYS || align=right data-sort-value="0.69" | 690 m || 
|-id=263 bgcolor=#fefefe
| 345263 ||  || — || November 4, 2005 || Catalina || CSS || — || align=right data-sort-value="0.87" | 870 m || 
|-id=264 bgcolor=#fefefe
| 345264 ||  || — || October 27, 2005 || Kitt Peak || Spacewatch || NYS || align=right data-sort-value="0.62" | 620 m || 
|-id=265 bgcolor=#fefefe
| 345265 ||  || — || October 25, 2005 || Kitt Peak || Spacewatch || — || align=right data-sort-value="0.75" | 750 m || 
|-id=266 bgcolor=#fefefe
| 345266 ||  || — || September 19, 1998 || Apache Point || SDSS || — || align=right data-sort-value="0.82" | 820 m || 
|-id=267 bgcolor=#fefefe
| 345267 ||  || — || November 5, 2005 || Mount Lemmon || Mount Lemmon Survey || — || align=right data-sort-value="0.76" | 760 m || 
|-id=268 bgcolor=#fefefe
| 345268 ||  || — || November 1, 2005 || Mount Lemmon || Mount Lemmon Survey || — || align=right data-sort-value="0.94" | 940 m || 
|-id=269 bgcolor=#fefefe
| 345269 ||  || — || November 1, 2005 || Mount Lemmon || Mount Lemmon Survey || — || align=right data-sort-value="0.79" | 790 m || 
|-id=270 bgcolor=#fefefe
| 345270 ||  || — || November 1, 2005 || Mount Lemmon || Mount Lemmon Survey || — || align=right data-sort-value="0.98" | 980 m || 
|-id=271 bgcolor=#fefefe
| 345271 ||  || — || October 29, 2005 || Mount Lemmon || Mount Lemmon Survey || NYS || align=right data-sort-value="0.60" | 600 m || 
|-id=272 bgcolor=#fefefe
| 345272 ||  || — || November 10, 2005 || Catalina || CSS || PHO || align=right | 1.3 km || 
|-id=273 bgcolor=#fefefe
| 345273 ||  || — || November 2, 2005 || Catalina || CSS || — || align=right | 1.1 km || 
|-id=274 bgcolor=#fefefe
| 345274 ||  || — || November 2, 2005 || Mount Lemmon || Mount Lemmon Survey || V || align=right data-sort-value="0.67" | 670 m || 
|-id=275 bgcolor=#fefefe
| 345275 ||  || — || November 3, 2005 || Mount Lemmon || Mount Lemmon Survey || FLO || align=right data-sort-value="0.80" | 800 m || 
|-id=276 bgcolor=#fefefe
| 345276 ||  || — || November 22, 2005 || Kitt Peak || Spacewatch || — || align=right data-sort-value="0.85" | 850 m || 
|-id=277 bgcolor=#fefefe
| 345277 ||  || — || November 21, 2005 || Kitt Peak || Spacewatch || NYS || align=right data-sort-value="0.60" | 600 m || 
|-id=278 bgcolor=#fefefe
| 345278 ||  || — || November 22, 2005 || Kitt Peak || Spacewatch || FLO || align=right data-sort-value="0.84" | 840 m || 
|-id=279 bgcolor=#fefefe
| 345279 ||  || — || November 22, 2005 || Kitt Peak || Spacewatch || EUT || align=right data-sort-value="0.53" | 530 m || 
|-id=280 bgcolor=#d6d6d6
| 345280 ||  || — || November 25, 2005 || Mount Lemmon || Mount Lemmon Survey || 3:2 || align=right | 4.1 km || 
|-id=281 bgcolor=#fefefe
| 345281 ||  || — || November 21, 2005 || Kitt Peak || Spacewatch || — || align=right data-sort-value="0.80" | 800 m || 
|-id=282 bgcolor=#fefefe
| 345282 ||  || — || November 25, 2005 || Mount Lemmon || Mount Lemmon Survey || — || align=right data-sort-value="0.82" | 820 m || 
|-id=283 bgcolor=#fefefe
| 345283 ||  || — || November 25, 2005 || Mount Lemmon || Mount Lemmon Survey || — || align=right | 1.0 km || 
|-id=284 bgcolor=#fefefe
| 345284 ||  || — || November 25, 2005 || Mount Lemmon || Mount Lemmon Survey || MAS || align=right data-sort-value="0.68" | 680 m || 
|-id=285 bgcolor=#fefefe
| 345285 ||  || — || November 21, 2005 || Catalina || CSS || PHO || align=right | 1.3 km || 
|-id=286 bgcolor=#fefefe
| 345286 ||  || — || November 25, 2005 || Mount Lemmon || Mount Lemmon Survey || MAS || align=right data-sort-value="0.69" | 690 m || 
|-id=287 bgcolor=#fefefe
| 345287 ||  || — || November 26, 2005 || Mount Lemmon || Mount Lemmon Survey || FLO || align=right | 1.1 km || 
|-id=288 bgcolor=#fefefe
| 345288 ||  || — || November 25, 2005 || Kitt Peak || Spacewatch || — || align=right data-sort-value="0.89" | 890 m || 
|-id=289 bgcolor=#fefefe
| 345289 ||  || — || November 28, 2005 || Catalina || CSS || FLO || align=right data-sort-value="0.77" | 770 m || 
|-id=290 bgcolor=#fefefe
| 345290 ||  || — || October 23, 2001 || Kitt Peak || Spacewatch || MAS || align=right data-sort-value="0.97" | 970 m || 
|-id=291 bgcolor=#fefefe
| 345291 ||  || — || November 26, 2005 || Catalina || CSS || — || align=right data-sort-value="0.90" | 900 m || 
|-id=292 bgcolor=#fefefe
| 345292 ||  || — || November 29, 2005 || Socorro || LINEAR || — || align=right | 1.0 km || 
|-id=293 bgcolor=#fefefe
| 345293 ||  || — || November 26, 2005 || Catalina || CSS || — || align=right data-sort-value="0.94" | 940 m || 
|-id=294 bgcolor=#fefefe
| 345294 ||  || — || November 25, 2005 || Mount Lemmon || Mount Lemmon Survey || FLO || align=right data-sort-value="0.71" | 710 m || 
|-id=295 bgcolor=#fefefe
| 345295 ||  || — || November 25, 2005 || Mount Lemmon || Mount Lemmon Survey || — || align=right | 1.2 km || 
|-id=296 bgcolor=#fefefe
| 345296 ||  || — || November 28, 2005 || Mount Lemmon || Mount Lemmon Survey || V || align=right data-sort-value="0.68" | 680 m || 
|-id=297 bgcolor=#fefefe
| 345297 ||  || — || November 28, 2005 || Catalina || CSS || ERI || align=right | 2.1 km || 
|-id=298 bgcolor=#fefefe
| 345298 ||  || — || November 29, 2005 || Kitt Peak || Spacewatch || — || align=right data-sort-value="0.86" | 860 m || 
|-id=299 bgcolor=#fefefe
| 345299 ||  || — || November 25, 2005 || Mount Lemmon || Mount Lemmon Survey || V || align=right data-sort-value="0.74" | 740 m || 
|-id=300 bgcolor=#fefefe
| 345300 ||  || — || November 28, 2005 || Socorro || LINEAR || — || align=right | 1.4 km || 
|}

345301–345400 

|-bgcolor=#d6d6d6
| 345301 ||  || — || November 29, 2005 || Mount Lemmon || Mount Lemmon Survey || 3:2 || align=right | 3.2 km || 
|-id=302 bgcolor=#fefefe
| 345302 ||  || — || November 30, 2005 || Mount Lemmon || Mount Lemmon Survey || — || align=right data-sort-value="0.89" | 890 m || 
|-id=303 bgcolor=#fefefe
| 345303 ||  || — || November 30, 2005 || Kitt Peak || Spacewatch || MAS || align=right data-sort-value="0.71" | 710 m || 
|-id=304 bgcolor=#d6d6d6
| 345304 ||  || — || November 21, 2005 || Kitt Peak || Spacewatch || 3:2 || align=right | 4.4 km || 
|-id=305 bgcolor=#fefefe
| 345305 ||  || — || November 30, 2005 || Kitt Peak || Spacewatch || NYS || align=right data-sort-value="0.88" | 880 m || 
|-id=306 bgcolor=#E9E9E9
| 345306 ||  || — || November 25, 2005 || Mount Lemmon || Mount Lemmon Survey || — || align=right | 2.2 km || 
|-id=307 bgcolor=#fefefe
| 345307 ||  || — || December 1, 2005 || Kitt Peak || Spacewatch || V || align=right data-sort-value="0.96" | 960 m || 
|-id=308 bgcolor=#d6d6d6
| 345308 ||  || — || December 2, 2005 || Mount Lemmon || Mount Lemmon Survey || 3:2 || align=right | 4.1 km || 
|-id=309 bgcolor=#fefefe
| 345309 ||  || — || December 4, 2005 || Mount Lemmon || Mount Lemmon Survey || NYS || align=right data-sort-value="0.93" | 930 m || 
|-id=310 bgcolor=#fefefe
| 345310 ||  || — || December 2, 2005 || Mount Lemmon || Mount Lemmon Survey || — || align=right data-sort-value="0.71" | 710 m || 
|-id=311 bgcolor=#fefefe
| 345311 ||  || — || December 4, 2005 || Kitt Peak || Spacewatch || MAS || align=right data-sort-value="0.82" | 820 m || 
|-id=312 bgcolor=#fefefe
| 345312 ||  || — || December 4, 2005 || Kitt Peak || Spacewatch || — || align=right data-sort-value="0.88" | 880 m || 
|-id=313 bgcolor=#fefefe
| 345313 ||  || — || December 2, 2005 || Kitt Peak || Spacewatch || V || align=right data-sort-value="0.78" | 780 m || 
|-id=314 bgcolor=#fefefe
| 345314 ||  || — || December 2, 2005 || Kitt Peak || Spacewatch || — || align=right | 1.0 km || 
|-id=315 bgcolor=#fefefe
| 345315 ||  || — || December 8, 2005 || Kitt Peak || Spacewatch || — || align=right data-sort-value="0.63" | 630 m || 
|-id=316 bgcolor=#fefefe
| 345316 ||  || — || December 1, 2005 || Kitt Peak || M. W. Buie || CLA || align=right | 1.4 km || 
|-id=317 bgcolor=#fefefe
| 345317 ||  || — || December 21, 2005 || Catalina || CSS || — || align=right | 1.1 km || 
|-id=318 bgcolor=#fefefe
| 345318 ||  || — || December 24, 2005 || Kitt Peak || Spacewatch || — || align=right data-sort-value="0.72" | 720 m || 
|-id=319 bgcolor=#fefefe
| 345319 ||  || — || December 24, 2005 || Kitt Peak || Spacewatch || MAS || align=right data-sort-value="0.62" | 620 m || 
|-id=320 bgcolor=#fefefe
| 345320 ||  || — || December 24, 2005 || Kitt Peak || Spacewatch || NYS || align=right data-sort-value="0.86" | 860 m || 
|-id=321 bgcolor=#fefefe
| 345321 ||  || — || December 22, 2005 || Kitt Peak || Spacewatch || — || align=right | 1.1 km || 
|-id=322 bgcolor=#fefefe
| 345322 ||  || — || December 22, 2005 || Kitt Peak || Spacewatch || NYS || align=right data-sort-value="0.50" | 500 m || 
|-id=323 bgcolor=#fefefe
| 345323 ||  || — || December 25, 2005 || Kitt Peak || Spacewatch || ERI || align=right | 2.3 km || 
|-id=324 bgcolor=#fefefe
| 345324 ||  || — || December 22, 2005 || Kitt Peak || Spacewatch || NYS || align=right data-sort-value="0.66" | 660 m || 
|-id=325 bgcolor=#fefefe
| 345325 ||  || — || December 25, 2005 || Kitt Peak || Spacewatch || MAS || align=right data-sort-value="0.69" | 690 m || 
|-id=326 bgcolor=#fefefe
| 345326 ||  || — || December 25, 2005 || Kitt Peak || Spacewatch || — || align=right data-sort-value="0.94" | 940 m || 
|-id=327 bgcolor=#fefefe
| 345327 ||  || — || December 22, 2005 || Kitt Peak || Spacewatch || fast? || align=right data-sort-value="0.86" | 860 m || 
|-id=328 bgcolor=#E9E9E9
| 345328 ||  || — || December 26, 2005 || Mount Lemmon || Mount Lemmon Survey || — || align=right data-sort-value="0.89" | 890 m || 
|-id=329 bgcolor=#fefefe
| 345329 ||  || — || December 26, 2005 || Kitt Peak || Spacewatch || NYS || align=right data-sort-value="0.71" | 710 m || 
|-id=330 bgcolor=#fefefe
| 345330 ||  || — || December 24, 2005 || Kitt Peak || Spacewatch || V || align=right data-sort-value="0.75" | 750 m || 
|-id=331 bgcolor=#fefefe
| 345331 ||  || — || December 25, 2005 || Kitt Peak || Spacewatch || NYS || align=right data-sort-value="0.63" | 630 m || 
|-id=332 bgcolor=#fefefe
| 345332 ||  || — || December 25, 2005 || Mount Lemmon || Mount Lemmon Survey || — || align=right | 1.1 km || 
|-id=333 bgcolor=#fefefe
| 345333 ||  || — || December 25, 2005 || Mount Lemmon || Mount Lemmon Survey || V || align=right data-sort-value="0.81" | 810 m || 
|-id=334 bgcolor=#fefefe
| 345334 ||  || — || December 25, 2005 || Kitt Peak || Spacewatch || NYS || align=right data-sort-value="0.66" | 660 m || 
|-id=335 bgcolor=#fefefe
| 345335 ||  || — || December 25, 2005 || Kitt Peak || Spacewatch || CLA || align=right | 1.5 km || 
|-id=336 bgcolor=#fefefe
| 345336 ||  || — || December 25, 2005 || Kitt Peak || Spacewatch || — || align=right | 1.0 km || 
|-id=337 bgcolor=#fefefe
| 345337 ||  || — || December 26, 2005 || Kitt Peak || Spacewatch || — || align=right | 1.0 km || 
|-id=338 bgcolor=#fefefe
| 345338 ||  || — || December 28, 2005 || Palomar || NEAT || — || align=right | 2.7 km || 
|-id=339 bgcolor=#fefefe
| 345339 ||  || — || December 29, 2005 || Socorro || LINEAR || V || align=right data-sort-value="0.73" | 730 m || 
|-id=340 bgcolor=#fefefe
| 345340 ||  || — || December 27, 2005 || Kitt Peak || Spacewatch || — || align=right data-sort-value="0.75" | 750 m || 
|-id=341 bgcolor=#fefefe
| 345341 ||  || — || December 27, 2005 || Kitt Peak || Spacewatch || NYS || align=right data-sort-value="0.73" | 730 m || 
|-id=342 bgcolor=#fefefe
| 345342 ||  || — || December 30, 2005 || Socorro || LINEAR || — || align=right | 1.9 km || 
|-id=343 bgcolor=#fefefe
| 345343 ||  || — || December 24, 2005 || Kitt Peak || Spacewatch || FLO || align=right data-sort-value="0.55" | 550 m || 
|-id=344 bgcolor=#fefefe
| 345344 ||  || — || December 26, 2005 || Mount Lemmon || Mount Lemmon Survey || MAS || align=right data-sort-value="0.65" | 650 m || 
|-id=345 bgcolor=#d6d6d6
| 345345 ||  || — || December 26, 2005 || Kitt Peak || Spacewatch || 3:2 || align=right | 4.6 km || 
|-id=346 bgcolor=#fefefe
| 345346 ||  || — || December 27, 2005 || Kitt Peak || Spacewatch || CLA || align=right | 2.0 km || 
|-id=347 bgcolor=#fefefe
| 345347 ||  || — || December 28, 2005 || Mount Lemmon || Mount Lemmon Survey || MAS || align=right data-sort-value="0.63" | 630 m || 
|-id=348 bgcolor=#fefefe
| 345348 ||  || — || December 30, 2005 || Kitt Peak || Spacewatch || MAS || align=right data-sort-value="0.86" | 860 m || 
|-id=349 bgcolor=#fefefe
| 345349 ||  || — || December 24, 2005 || Kitt Peak || Spacewatch || — || align=right | 1.1 km || 
|-id=350 bgcolor=#fefefe
| 345350 ||  || — || December 26, 2005 || Mount Lemmon || Mount Lemmon Survey || MAS || align=right data-sort-value="0.62" | 620 m || 
|-id=351 bgcolor=#fefefe
| 345351 ||  || — || November 12, 2005 || Kitt Peak || Spacewatch || FLO || align=right data-sort-value="0.64" | 640 m || 
|-id=352 bgcolor=#fefefe
| 345352 ||  || — || December 25, 2005 || Mount Lemmon || Mount Lemmon Survey || MAS || align=right data-sort-value="0.65" | 650 m || 
|-id=353 bgcolor=#fefefe
| 345353 ||  || — || December 30, 2005 || Kitt Peak || Spacewatch || MAS || align=right data-sort-value="0.61" | 610 m || 
|-id=354 bgcolor=#E9E9E9
| 345354 ||  || — || December 30, 2005 || Mount Lemmon || Mount Lemmon Survey || — || align=right | 1.4 km || 
|-id=355 bgcolor=#fefefe
| 345355 ||  || — || January 2, 2006 || Socorro || LINEAR || — || align=right | 1.3 km || 
|-id=356 bgcolor=#fefefe
| 345356 ||  || — || January 4, 2006 || Mount Lemmon || Mount Lemmon Survey || NYS || align=right data-sort-value="0.78" | 780 m || 
|-id=357 bgcolor=#fefefe
| 345357 ||  || — || January 4, 2006 || Catalina || CSS || — || align=right | 2.0 km || 
|-id=358 bgcolor=#fefefe
| 345358 ||  || — || January 5, 2006 || Mount Lemmon || Mount Lemmon Survey || MAS || align=right data-sort-value="0.68" | 680 m || 
|-id=359 bgcolor=#E9E9E9
| 345359 ||  || — || January 5, 2006 || Catalina || CSS || — || align=right | 1.3 km || 
|-id=360 bgcolor=#fefefe
| 345360 ||  || — || January 5, 2006 || Catalina || CSS || — || align=right data-sort-value="0.98" | 980 m || 
|-id=361 bgcolor=#fefefe
| 345361 ||  || — || January 5, 2006 || Catalina || CSS || — || align=right | 1.1 km || 
|-id=362 bgcolor=#fefefe
| 345362 ||  || — || January 6, 2006 || Kitt Peak || Spacewatch || NYS || align=right data-sort-value="0.78" | 780 m || 
|-id=363 bgcolor=#fefefe
| 345363 ||  || — || January 4, 2006 || Kitt Peak || Spacewatch || NYS || align=right data-sort-value="0.59" | 590 m || 
|-id=364 bgcolor=#fefefe
| 345364 ||  || — || January 5, 2006 || Kitt Peak || Spacewatch || NYS || align=right data-sort-value="0.59" | 590 m || 
|-id=365 bgcolor=#fefefe
| 345365 ||  || — || January 6, 2006 || Kitt Peak || Spacewatch || V || align=right data-sort-value="0.79" | 790 m || 
|-id=366 bgcolor=#fefefe
| 345366 ||  || — || January 6, 2006 || Kitt Peak || Spacewatch || V || align=right data-sort-value="0.65" | 650 m || 
|-id=367 bgcolor=#d6d6d6
| 345367 ||  || — || January 6, 2006 || Kitt Peak || Spacewatch || SHU3:2 || align=right | 5.1 km || 
|-id=368 bgcolor=#E9E9E9
| 345368 ||  || — || January 6, 2006 || Kitt Peak || Spacewatch || — || align=right | 1.1 km || 
|-id=369 bgcolor=#fefefe
| 345369 ||  || — || January 6, 2006 || Mount Lemmon || Mount Lemmon Survey || — || align=right | 1.1 km || 
|-id=370 bgcolor=#fefefe
| 345370 ||  || — || December 28, 2005 || Kitt Peak || Spacewatch || V || align=right data-sort-value="0.72" | 720 m || 
|-id=371 bgcolor=#fefefe
| 345371 ||  || — || January 4, 2006 || Catalina || CSS || PHO || align=right | 1.6 km || 
|-id=372 bgcolor=#fefefe
| 345372 ||  || — || January 22, 2006 || Anderson Mesa || LONEOS || — || align=right | 1.1 km || 
|-id=373 bgcolor=#fefefe
| 345373 ||  || — || January 20, 2006 || Kitt Peak || Spacewatch || — || align=right data-sort-value="0.85" | 850 m || 
|-id=374 bgcolor=#fefefe
| 345374 ||  || — || January 23, 2006 || Nyukasa || Mount Nyukasa Stn. || MAS || align=right data-sort-value="0.90" | 900 m || 
|-id=375 bgcolor=#fefefe
| 345375 ||  || — || January 20, 2006 || Kitt Peak || Spacewatch || MAS || align=right data-sort-value="0.71" | 710 m || 
|-id=376 bgcolor=#fefefe
| 345376 ||  || — || January 20, 2006 || Kitt Peak || Spacewatch || V || align=right data-sort-value="0.77" | 770 m || 
|-id=377 bgcolor=#fefefe
| 345377 ||  || — || January 23, 2006 || Kitt Peak || Spacewatch || — || align=right data-sort-value="0.74" | 740 m || 
|-id=378 bgcolor=#fefefe
| 345378 ||  || — || January 23, 2006 || Mount Lemmon || Mount Lemmon Survey || NYS || align=right data-sort-value="0.78" | 780 m || 
|-id=379 bgcolor=#fefefe
| 345379 ||  || — || January 21, 2006 || Kitt Peak || Spacewatch || — || align=right data-sort-value="0.89" | 890 m || 
|-id=380 bgcolor=#E9E9E9
| 345380 ||  || — || January 22, 2006 || Mount Lemmon || Mount Lemmon Survey || — || align=right | 1.4 km || 
|-id=381 bgcolor=#fefefe
| 345381 ||  || — || January 25, 2006 || Kitt Peak || Spacewatch || NYS || align=right data-sort-value="0.73" | 730 m || 
|-id=382 bgcolor=#fefefe
| 345382 ||  || — || January 22, 2006 || Mount Lemmon || Mount Lemmon Survey || MAS || align=right data-sort-value="0.81" | 810 m || 
|-id=383 bgcolor=#fefefe
| 345383 ||  || — || January 23, 2006 || Kitt Peak || Spacewatch || MAS || align=right data-sort-value="0.79" | 790 m || 
|-id=384 bgcolor=#fefefe
| 345384 ||  || — || January 23, 2006 || Kitt Peak || Spacewatch || — || align=right data-sort-value="0.81" | 810 m || 
|-id=385 bgcolor=#E9E9E9
| 345385 ||  || — || January 23, 2006 || Kitt Peak || Spacewatch || — || align=right | 1.5 km || 
|-id=386 bgcolor=#fefefe
| 345386 ||  || — || January 24, 2006 || Kitt Peak || Spacewatch || — || align=right | 1.8 km || 
|-id=387 bgcolor=#fefefe
| 345387 ||  || — || January 25, 2006 || Kitt Peak || Spacewatch || NYS || align=right data-sort-value="0.75" | 750 m || 
|-id=388 bgcolor=#E9E9E9
| 345388 ||  || — || January 26, 2006 || Kitt Peak || Spacewatch || — || align=right | 2.2 km || 
|-id=389 bgcolor=#fefefe
| 345389 ||  || — || January 26, 2006 || Kitt Peak || Spacewatch || — || align=right data-sort-value="0.84" | 840 m || 
|-id=390 bgcolor=#fefefe
| 345390 ||  || — || January 22, 2006 || Mount Lemmon || Mount Lemmon Survey || NYS || align=right data-sort-value="0.76" | 760 m || 
|-id=391 bgcolor=#fefefe
| 345391 ||  || — || January 26, 2006 || Mount Lemmon || Mount Lemmon Survey || MAS || align=right data-sort-value="0.70" | 700 m || 
|-id=392 bgcolor=#fefefe
| 345392 ||  || — || January 26, 2006 || Mount Lemmon || Mount Lemmon Survey || NYS || align=right data-sort-value="0.76" | 760 m || 
|-id=393 bgcolor=#E9E9E9
| 345393 ||  || — || January 26, 2006 || Mount Lemmon || Mount Lemmon Survey || — || align=right | 1.4 km || 
|-id=394 bgcolor=#fefefe
| 345394 ||  || — || January 28, 2006 || Kitt Peak || Spacewatch || — || align=right data-sort-value="0.97" | 970 m || 
|-id=395 bgcolor=#fefefe
| 345395 ||  || — || January 28, 2006 || Kitt Peak || Spacewatch || — || align=right data-sort-value="0.62" | 620 m || 
|-id=396 bgcolor=#fefefe
| 345396 ||  || — || January 30, 2006 || Catalina || CSS || — || align=right | 2.3 km || 
|-id=397 bgcolor=#fefefe
| 345397 ||  || — || January 30, 2006 || Kitt Peak || Spacewatch || NYS || align=right data-sort-value="0.65" | 650 m || 
|-id=398 bgcolor=#E9E9E9
| 345398 ||  || — || January 31, 2006 || Mount Lemmon || Mount Lemmon Survey || — || align=right | 1.1 km || 
|-id=399 bgcolor=#E9E9E9
| 345399 ||  || — || January 31, 2006 || Catalina || CSS || — || align=right | 1.8 km || 
|-id=400 bgcolor=#E9E9E9
| 345400 ||  || — || January 30, 2006 || Kitt Peak || Spacewatch || — || align=right | 1.1 km || 
|}

345401–345500 

|-bgcolor=#fefefe
| 345401 ||  || — || January 31, 2006 || Kitt Peak || Spacewatch || EUT || align=right data-sort-value="0.61" | 610 m || 
|-id=402 bgcolor=#fefefe
| 345402 ||  || — || January 31, 2006 || Kitt Peak || Spacewatch || NYS || align=right data-sort-value="0.68" | 680 m || 
|-id=403 bgcolor=#E9E9E9
| 345403 ||  || — || January 31, 2006 || Kitt Peak || Spacewatch || — || align=right | 2.8 km || 
|-id=404 bgcolor=#fefefe
| 345404 ||  || — || January 31, 2006 || Kitt Peak || Spacewatch || MAS || align=right data-sort-value="0.76" | 760 m || 
|-id=405 bgcolor=#fefefe
| 345405 ||  || — || January 31, 2006 || Kitt Peak || Spacewatch || MAS || align=right data-sort-value="0.71" | 710 m || 
|-id=406 bgcolor=#fefefe
| 345406 ||  || — || January 31, 2006 || Kitt Peak || Spacewatch || NYS || align=right data-sort-value="0.54" | 540 m || 
|-id=407 bgcolor=#C2FFFF
| 345407 ||  || — || January 31, 2006 || Kitt Peak || Spacewatch || L5 || align=right | 12 km || 
|-id=408 bgcolor=#E9E9E9
| 345408 ||  || — || January 31, 2006 || Kitt Peak || Spacewatch || — || align=right | 1.6 km || 
|-id=409 bgcolor=#E9E9E9
| 345409 ||  || — || February 1, 2006 || Kitt Peak || Spacewatch || — || align=right | 1.2 km || 
|-id=410 bgcolor=#fefefe
| 345410 ||  || — || February 1, 2006 || Mount Lemmon || Mount Lemmon Survey || NYS || align=right data-sort-value="0.72" | 720 m || 
|-id=411 bgcolor=#fefefe
| 345411 ||  || — || February 2, 2006 || Catalina || CSS || NYS || align=right data-sort-value="0.78" | 780 m || 
|-id=412 bgcolor=#E9E9E9
| 345412 ||  || — || February 2, 2006 || Kitt Peak || Spacewatch || — || align=right | 1.2 km || 
|-id=413 bgcolor=#E9E9E9
| 345413 ||  || — || February 3, 2006 || Mount Lemmon || Mount Lemmon Survey || — || align=right | 3.1 km || 
|-id=414 bgcolor=#d6d6d6
| 345414 ||  || — || November 20, 2004 || Goodricke-Pigott || R. A. Tucker || HIL3:2 || align=right | 5.5 km || 
|-id=415 bgcolor=#E9E9E9
| 345415 ||  || — || February 21, 2006 || Mount Lemmon || Mount Lemmon Survey || — || align=right data-sort-value="0.85" | 850 m || 
|-id=416 bgcolor=#fefefe
| 345416 ||  || — || February 20, 2006 || Kitt Peak || Spacewatch || NYS || align=right data-sort-value="0.69" | 690 m || 
|-id=417 bgcolor=#fefefe
| 345417 ||  || — || September 7, 2004 || Kitt Peak || Spacewatch || MAS || align=right data-sort-value="0.72" | 720 m || 
|-id=418 bgcolor=#E9E9E9
| 345418 ||  || — || February 20, 2006 || Kitt Peak || Spacewatch || — || align=right | 1.3 km || 
|-id=419 bgcolor=#E9E9E9
| 345419 ||  || — || February 20, 2006 || Kitt Peak || Spacewatch || HEN || align=right | 1.0 km || 
|-id=420 bgcolor=#fefefe
| 345420 ||  || — || February 20, 2006 || Kitt Peak || Spacewatch || NYS || align=right data-sort-value="0.61" | 610 m || 
|-id=421 bgcolor=#E9E9E9
| 345421 ||  || — || February 20, 2006 || Kitt Peak || Spacewatch || — || align=right data-sort-value="0.95" | 950 m || 
|-id=422 bgcolor=#fefefe
| 345422 ||  || — || February 21, 2006 || Anderson Mesa || LONEOS || NYS || align=right | 1.6 km || 
|-id=423 bgcolor=#E9E9E9
| 345423 ||  || — || February 20, 2006 || Kitt Peak || Spacewatch || — || align=right | 1.3 km || 
|-id=424 bgcolor=#E9E9E9
| 345424 ||  || — || February 20, 2006 || Kitt Peak || Spacewatch || — || align=right | 1.2 km || 
|-id=425 bgcolor=#fefefe
| 345425 ||  || — || February 21, 2006 || Mount Lemmon || Mount Lemmon Survey || MAS || align=right data-sort-value="0.65" | 650 m || 
|-id=426 bgcolor=#fefefe
| 345426 ||  || — || February 22, 2006 || Socorro || LINEAR || — || align=right | 1.1 km || 
|-id=427 bgcolor=#E9E9E9
| 345427 ||  || — || February 22, 2006 || Mount Lemmon || Mount Lemmon Survey || — || align=right | 1.7 km || 
|-id=428 bgcolor=#E9E9E9
| 345428 ||  || — || February 24, 2006 || Kitt Peak || Spacewatch || — || align=right | 1.5 km || 
|-id=429 bgcolor=#E9E9E9
| 345429 ||  || — || February 24, 2006 || Kitt Peak || Spacewatch || — || align=right data-sort-value="0.96" | 960 m || 
|-id=430 bgcolor=#fefefe
| 345430 ||  || — || February 24, 2006 || Kitt Peak || Spacewatch || NYS || align=right data-sort-value="0.48" | 480 m || 
|-id=431 bgcolor=#E9E9E9
| 345431 ||  || — || February 24, 2006 || Kitt Peak || Spacewatch || — || align=right | 1.5 km || 
|-id=432 bgcolor=#E9E9E9
| 345432 ||  || — || February 24, 2006 || Kitt Peak || Spacewatch || — || align=right | 1.5 km || 
|-id=433 bgcolor=#fefefe
| 345433 ||  || — || February 25, 2006 || Kitt Peak || Spacewatch || V || align=right data-sort-value="0.65" | 650 m || 
|-id=434 bgcolor=#C2FFFF
| 345434 ||  || — || February 25, 2006 || Mount Lemmon || Mount Lemmon Survey || L5 || align=right | 8.0 km || 
|-id=435 bgcolor=#E9E9E9
| 345435 ||  || — || February 24, 2006 || Mount Lemmon || Mount Lemmon Survey || ADE || align=right | 2.1 km || 
|-id=436 bgcolor=#fefefe
| 345436 ||  || — || February 25, 2006 || Kitt Peak || Spacewatch || — || align=right data-sort-value="0.97" | 970 m || 
|-id=437 bgcolor=#E9E9E9
| 345437 ||  || — || February 25, 2006 || Kitt Peak || Spacewatch || — || align=right | 1.3 km || 
|-id=438 bgcolor=#E9E9E9
| 345438 ||  || — || February 25, 2006 || Kitt Peak || Spacewatch || — || align=right | 1.0 km || 
|-id=439 bgcolor=#fefefe
| 345439 ||  || — || February 27, 2006 || Kitt Peak || Spacewatch || NYS || align=right data-sort-value="0.81" | 810 m || 
|-id=440 bgcolor=#fefefe
| 345440 ||  || — || February 27, 2006 || Kitt Peak || Spacewatch || NYS || align=right data-sort-value="0.72" | 720 m || 
|-id=441 bgcolor=#E9E9E9
| 345441 ||  || — || February 27, 2006 || Mount Lemmon || Mount Lemmon Survey || — || align=right | 1.1 km || 
|-id=442 bgcolor=#fefefe
| 345442 ||  || — || February 27, 2006 || Mount Lemmon || Mount Lemmon Survey || — || align=right data-sort-value="0.74" | 740 m || 
|-id=443 bgcolor=#E9E9E9
| 345443 ||  || — || February 24, 2006 || Mount Lemmon || Mount Lemmon Survey || — || align=right data-sort-value="0.96" | 960 m || 
|-id=444 bgcolor=#E9E9E9
| 345444 ||  || — || February 28, 2006 || Mount Lemmon || Mount Lemmon Survey || NEM || align=right | 3.2 km || 
|-id=445 bgcolor=#E9E9E9
| 345445 ||  || — || March 2, 2006 || Kitt Peak || Spacewatch || AGN || align=right | 1.3 km || 
|-id=446 bgcolor=#fefefe
| 345446 ||  || — || March 2, 2006 || Kitt Peak || Spacewatch || MAS || align=right data-sort-value="0.73" | 730 m || 
|-id=447 bgcolor=#fefefe
| 345447 ||  || — || March 3, 2006 || Kitt Peak || Spacewatch || — || align=right | 1.1 km || 
|-id=448 bgcolor=#E9E9E9
| 345448 ||  || — || March 3, 2006 || Kitt Peak || Spacewatch || — || align=right | 1.2 km || 
|-id=449 bgcolor=#E9E9E9
| 345449 ||  || — || March 3, 2006 || Kitt Peak || Spacewatch || JUN || align=right | 1.4 km || 
|-id=450 bgcolor=#E9E9E9
| 345450 ||  || — || March 4, 2006 || Catalina || CSS || — || align=right | 1.6 km || 
|-id=451 bgcolor=#E9E9E9
| 345451 ||  || — || March 4, 2006 || Catalina || CSS || — || align=right | 1.4 km || 
|-id=452 bgcolor=#E9E9E9
| 345452 ||  || — || March 4, 2006 || Kitt Peak || Spacewatch || — || align=right | 1.5 km || 
|-id=453 bgcolor=#E9E9E9
| 345453 ||  || — || December 14, 2004 || Catalina || CSS || — || align=right | 2.0 km || 
|-id=454 bgcolor=#E9E9E9
| 345454 ||  || — || March 3, 2006 || Catalina || CSS || JUN || align=right | 1.3 km || 
|-id=455 bgcolor=#fefefe
| 345455 ||  || — || March 19, 2006 || Socorro || LINEAR || — || align=right | 1.5 km || 
|-id=456 bgcolor=#E9E9E9
| 345456 ||  || — || March 21, 2006 || Mount Lemmon || Mount Lemmon Survey || — || align=right | 1.4 km || 
|-id=457 bgcolor=#E9E9E9
| 345457 ||  || — || March 4, 2006 || Kitt Peak || Spacewatch || EUN || align=right | 1.4 km || 
|-id=458 bgcolor=#fefefe
| 345458 ||  || — || March 23, 2006 || Catalina || CSS || — || align=right | 1.1 km || 
|-id=459 bgcolor=#E9E9E9
| 345459 ||  || — || March 23, 2006 || Kitt Peak || Spacewatch || KON || align=right | 2.4 km || 
|-id=460 bgcolor=#E9E9E9
| 345460 ||  || — || March 29, 2006 || Lulin Observatory || Q.-z. Ye || — || align=right | 3.1 km || 
|-id=461 bgcolor=#E9E9E9
| 345461 ||  || — || February 24, 2006 || Catalina || CSS || — || align=right | 1.5 km || 
|-id=462 bgcolor=#E9E9E9
| 345462 ||  || — || March 25, 2006 || Kitt Peak || Spacewatch || — || align=right | 1.6 km || 
|-id=463 bgcolor=#E9E9E9
| 345463 ||  || — || March 26, 2006 || Anderson Mesa || LONEOS || EUN || align=right | 1.7 km || 
|-id=464 bgcolor=#E9E9E9
| 345464 ||  || — || April 2, 2006 || Kitt Peak || Spacewatch || — || align=right | 3.8 km || 
|-id=465 bgcolor=#E9E9E9
| 345465 ||  || — || April 2, 2006 || Kitt Peak || Spacewatch || — || align=right | 1.4 km || 
|-id=466 bgcolor=#E9E9E9
| 345466 ||  || — || April 2, 2006 || Kitt Peak || Spacewatch || EUN || align=right | 1.1 km || 
|-id=467 bgcolor=#d6d6d6
| 345467 ||  || — || April 7, 2006 || Mount Lemmon || Mount Lemmon Survey || — || align=right | 2.9 km || 
|-id=468 bgcolor=#E9E9E9
| 345468 ||  || — || April 9, 2006 || Catalina || CSS || — || align=right | 3.8 km || 
|-id=469 bgcolor=#E9E9E9
| 345469 ||  || — || April 19, 2006 || Kitt Peak || Spacewatch || — || align=right | 1.0 km || 
|-id=470 bgcolor=#E9E9E9
| 345470 ||  || — || April 20, 2006 || Kitt Peak || Spacewatch || HEN || align=right | 1.3 km || 
|-id=471 bgcolor=#E9E9E9
| 345471 ||  || — || April 20, 2006 || Kitt Peak || Spacewatch || — || align=right | 2.9 km || 
|-id=472 bgcolor=#E9E9E9
| 345472 ||  || — || April 20, 2006 || Kitt Peak || Spacewatch || — || align=right | 1.00 km || 
|-id=473 bgcolor=#E9E9E9
| 345473 ||  || — || April 20, 2006 || Kitt Peak || Spacewatch || — || align=right | 1.4 km || 
|-id=474 bgcolor=#E9E9E9
| 345474 ||  || — || April 19, 2006 || Mount Lemmon || Mount Lemmon Survey || — || align=right | 1.1 km || 
|-id=475 bgcolor=#fefefe
| 345475 ||  || — || April 20, 2006 || Kitt Peak || Spacewatch || H || align=right data-sort-value="0.75" | 750 m || 
|-id=476 bgcolor=#fefefe
| 345476 ||  || — || April 24, 2006 || Kitt Peak || Spacewatch || — || align=right data-sort-value="0.47" | 470 m || 
|-id=477 bgcolor=#E9E9E9
| 345477 ||  || — || April 24, 2006 || Kitt Peak || Spacewatch || — || align=right | 1.0 km || 
|-id=478 bgcolor=#E9E9E9
| 345478 ||  || — || April 24, 2006 || Mount Lemmon || Mount Lemmon Survey || HEN || align=right | 1.0 km || 
|-id=479 bgcolor=#E9E9E9
| 345479 ||  || — || April 25, 2006 || Kitt Peak || Spacewatch || — || align=right | 3.0 km || 
|-id=480 bgcolor=#E9E9E9
| 345480 ||  || — || April 26, 2006 || Kitt Peak || Spacewatch || — || align=right | 1.7 km || 
|-id=481 bgcolor=#E9E9E9
| 345481 ||  || — || April 26, 2006 || Kitt Peak || Spacewatch || — || align=right | 2.9 km || 
|-id=482 bgcolor=#E9E9E9
| 345482 ||  || — || April 30, 2006 || Catalina || CSS || JUN || align=right | 1.7 km || 
|-id=483 bgcolor=#E9E9E9
| 345483 ||  || — || April 29, 2006 || Kitt Peak || Spacewatch || — || align=right | 2.0 km || 
|-id=484 bgcolor=#E9E9E9
| 345484 ||  || — || April 30, 2006 || Kitt Peak || Spacewatch || — || align=right | 1.5 km || 
|-id=485 bgcolor=#E9E9E9
| 345485 ||  || — || April 30, 2006 || Kitt Peak || Spacewatch || HOF || align=right | 2.4 km || 
|-id=486 bgcolor=#E9E9E9
| 345486 ||  || — || April 30, 2006 || Kitt Peak || Spacewatch || — || align=right | 2.2 km || 
|-id=487 bgcolor=#E9E9E9
| 345487 ||  || — || April 30, 2006 || Kitt Peak || Spacewatch || — || align=right | 2.6 km || 
|-id=488 bgcolor=#E9E9E9
| 345488 ||  || — || April 21, 2006 || Kitt Peak || Spacewatch || — || align=right | 1.7 km || 
|-id=489 bgcolor=#E9E9E9
| 345489 ||  || — || April 8, 2006 || Kitt Peak || Spacewatch || MAR || align=right | 1.2 km || 
|-id=490 bgcolor=#E9E9E9
| 345490 || 2006 JV || — || May 1, 2006 || Needville || J. Dellinger, W. G. Dillon || — || align=right | 1.4 km || 
|-id=491 bgcolor=#E9E9E9
| 345491 ||  || — || May 1, 2006 || Kitt Peak || Spacewatch || — || align=right | 1.1 km || 
|-id=492 bgcolor=#E9E9E9
| 345492 ||  || — || May 1, 2006 || Socorro || LINEAR || MAR || align=right | 1.5 km || 
|-id=493 bgcolor=#E9E9E9
| 345493 ||  || — || May 2, 2006 || Mount Lemmon || Mount Lemmon Survey || — || align=right | 1.3 km || 
|-id=494 bgcolor=#E9E9E9
| 345494 ||  || — || May 1, 2006 || Kitt Peak || Spacewatch || — || align=right | 1.6 km || 
|-id=495 bgcolor=#E9E9E9
| 345495 ||  || — || May 1, 2006 || Kitt Peak || Spacewatch || — || align=right | 2.9 km || 
|-id=496 bgcolor=#E9E9E9
| 345496 ||  || — || May 2, 2006 || Kitt Peak || Spacewatch || — || align=right | 1.4 km || 
|-id=497 bgcolor=#E9E9E9
| 345497 ||  || — || May 3, 2006 || Kitt Peak || Spacewatch || ADE || align=right | 1.8 km || 
|-id=498 bgcolor=#E9E9E9
| 345498 ||  || — || May 3, 2006 || Kitt Peak || Spacewatch || — || align=right | 1.8 km || 
|-id=499 bgcolor=#E9E9E9
| 345499 ||  || — || April 25, 2006 || Kitt Peak || Spacewatch || — || align=right | 1.6 km || 
|-id=500 bgcolor=#E9E9E9
| 345500 ||  || — || May 4, 2006 || Kitt Peak || Spacewatch || NEM || align=right | 2.5 km || 
|}

345501–345600 

|-bgcolor=#E9E9E9
| 345501 ||  || — || May 5, 2006 || Kitt Peak || Spacewatch || — || align=right | 2.9 km || 
|-id=502 bgcolor=#E9E9E9
| 345502 ||  || — || November 21, 2003 || Kitt Peak || Spacewatch || — || align=right | 2.6 km || 
|-id=503 bgcolor=#E9E9E9
| 345503 ||  || — || May 6, 2006 || Kitt Peak || Spacewatch || — || align=right | 2.7 km || 
|-id=504 bgcolor=#E9E9E9
| 345504 ||  || — || May 8, 2006 || Siding Spring || SSS || — || align=right | 3.4 km || 
|-id=505 bgcolor=#E9E9E9
| 345505 ||  || — || May 6, 2006 || Mount Lemmon || Mount Lemmon Survey || ADE || align=right | 2.9 km || 
|-id=506 bgcolor=#E9E9E9
| 345506 ||  || — || May 8, 2006 || Mount Lemmon || Mount Lemmon Survey || — || align=right | 3.1 km || 
|-id=507 bgcolor=#E9E9E9
| 345507 ||  || — || May 1, 2006 || Catalina || CSS || — || align=right | 2.9 km || 
|-id=508 bgcolor=#E9E9E9
| 345508 ||  || — || May 1, 2006 || Kitt Peak || M. W. Buie || — || align=right | 2.3 km || 
|-id=509 bgcolor=#E9E9E9
| 345509 ||  || — || May 4, 2006 || Kitt Peak || Spacewatch || HEN || align=right | 1.2 km || 
|-id=510 bgcolor=#FA8072
| 345510 ||  || — || May 16, 2006 || Palomar || NEAT || H || align=right data-sort-value="0.72" | 720 m || 
|-id=511 bgcolor=#d6d6d6
| 345511 ||  || — || March 26, 2006 || Anderson Mesa || LONEOS || — || align=right | 4.4 km || 
|-id=512 bgcolor=#E9E9E9
| 345512 ||  || — || May 20, 2006 || Anderson Mesa || LONEOS || EUN || align=right | 1.7 km || 
|-id=513 bgcolor=#E9E9E9
| 345513 ||  || — || May 19, 2006 || Mount Lemmon || Mount Lemmon Survey || — || align=right | 2.6 km || 
|-id=514 bgcolor=#E9E9E9
| 345514 ||  || — || May 20, 2006 || Kitt Peak || Spacewatch || — || align=right | 2.2 km || 
|-id=515 bgcolor=#fefefe
| 345515 ||  || — || April 9, 2006 || Mount Lemmon || Mount Lemmon Survey || H || align=right data-sort-value="0.59" | 590 m || 
|-id=516 bgcolor=#E9E9E9
| 345516 ||  || — || May 21, 2006 || Mount Lemmon || Mount Lemmon Survey || — || align=right | 1.4 km || 
|-id=517 bgcolor=#E9E9E9
| 345517 ||  || — || May 21, 2006 || Kitt Peak || Spacewatch || — || align=right | 2.4 km || 
|-id=518 bgcolor=#E9E9E9
| 345518 ||  || — || May 22, 2006 || Kitt Peak || Spacewatch || KON || align=right | 3.4 km || 
|-id=519 bgcolor=#E9E9E9
| 345519 ||  || — || May 22, 2006 || Kitt Peak || Spacewatch || EUN || align=right | 1.3 km || 
|-id=520 bgcolor=#d6d6d6
| 345520 ||  || — || May 22, 2006 || Kitt Peak || Spacewatch || — || align=right | 3.0 km || 
|-id=521 bgcolor=#E9E9E9
| 345521 ||  || — || May 22, 2006 || Kitt Peak || Spacewatch || WIT || align=right | 1.2 km || 
|-id=522 bgcolor=#d6d6d6
| 345522 ||  || — || May 23, 2006 || Kitt Peak || Spacewatch || — || align=right | 3.2 km || 
|-id=523 bgcolor=#E9E9E9
| 345523 ||  || — || May 24, 2006 || Kitt Peak || Spacewatch || — || align=right | 2.6 km || 
|-id=524 bgcolor=#E9E9E9
| 345524 ||  || — || May 27, 2006 || Kitt Peak || Spacewatch || — || align=right | 2.9 km || 
|-id=525 bgcolor=#E9E9E9
| 345525 ||  || — || May 31, 2006 || Mount Lemmon || Mount Lemmon Survey || — || align=right | 1.1 km || 
|-id=526 bgcolor=#E9E9E9
| 345526 ||  || — || November 19, 2003 || Palomar || NEAT || WIT || align=right | 1.4 km || 
|-id=527 bgcolor=#d6d6d6
| 345527 ||  || — || May 23, 2006 || Kitt Peak || Spacewatch || — || align=right | 3.6 km || 
|-id=528 bgcolor=#fefefe
| 345528 ||  || — || June 19, 2006 || Mount Lemmon || Mount Lemmon Survey || H || align=right | 1.1 km || 
|-id=529 bgcolor=#d6d6d6
| 345529 || 2006 NS || — || July 5, 2006 || Lulin Observatory || LUSS || — || align=right | 8.6 km || 
|-id=530 bgcolor=#d6d6d6
| 345530 ||  || — || May 26, 2006 || Catalina || CSS || — || align=right | 3.1 km || 
|-id=531 bgcolor=#fefefe
| 345531 ||  || — || July 20, 2006 || Palomar || NEAT || H || align=right | 1.0 km || 
|-id=532 bgcolor=#d6d6d6
| 345532 ||  || — || August 15, 2006 || Reedy Creek || J. Broughton || — || align=right | 3.4 km || 
|-id=533 bgcolor=#d6d6d6
| 345533 ||  || — || August 19, 2006 || Kitt Peak || Spacewatch || — || align=right | 5.6 km || 
|-id=534 bgcolor=#d6d6d6
| 345534 ||  || — || August 20, 2006 || Kitt Peak || Spacewatch || EOS || align=right | 2.5 km || 
|-id=535 bgcolor=#d6d6d6
| 345535 ||  || — || August 21, 2006 || Kitt Peak || Spacewatch || — || align=right | 2.8 km || 
|-id=536 bgcolor=#d6d6d6
| 345536 ||  || — || August 21, 2006 || Kitt Peak || Spacewatch || — || align=right | 4.3 km || 
|-id=537 bgcolor=#d6d6d6
| 345537 ||  || — || August 24, 2006 || Eskridge || Farpoint Obs. || — || align=right | 3.3 km || 
|-id=538 bgcolor=#d6d6d6
| 345538 ||  || — || August 27, 2006 || Kitt Peak || Spacewatch || — || align=right | 3.1 km || 
|-id=539 bgcolor=#d6d6d6
| 345539 ||  || — || September 21, 2001 || Kitt Peak || Spacewatch || — || align=right | 2.1 km || 
|-id=540 bgcolor=#d6d6d6
| 345540 ||  || — || August 24, 2006 || Socorro || LINEAR || — || align=right | 5.1 km || 
|-id=541 bgcolor=#d6d6d6
| 345541 ||  || — || August 28, 2006 || Anderson Mesa || LONEOS || — || align=right | 4.1 km || 
|-id=542 bgcolor=#d6d6d6
| 345542 ||  || — || August 28, 2006 || Catalina || CSS || — || align=right | 2.9 km || 
|-id=543 bgcolor=#d6d6d6
| 345543 ||  || — || August 24, 2006 || Socorro || LINEAR || — || align=right | 3.8 km || 
|-id=544 bgcolor=#d6d6d6
| 345544 ||  || — || August 27, 2006 || Anderson Mesa || LONEOS || — || align=right | 4.3 km || 
|-id=545 bgcolor=#d6d6d6
| 345545 ||  || — || February 23, 1998 || Kitt Peak || Spacewatch || — || align=right | 3.1 km || 
|-id=546 bgcolor=#d6d6d6
| 345546 ||  || — || August 18, 2006 || Kitt Peak || Spacewatch || THM || align=right | 2.8 km || 
|-id=547 bgcolor=#d6d6d6
| 345547 ||  || — || August 19, 2006 || Kitt Peak || Spacewatch || — || align=right | 2.8 km || 
|-id=548 bgcolor=#d6d6d6
| 345548 ||  || — || August 30, 2006 || Anderson Mesa || LONEOS || EOS || align=right | 2.6 km || 
|-id=549 bgcolor=#d6d6d6
| 345549 ||  || — || September 12, 2006 || Catalina || CSS || 7:4 || align=right | 4.1 km || 
|-id=550 bgcolor=#d6d6d6
| 345550 ||  || — || September 14, 2006 || Kitt Peak || Spacewatch || — || align=right | 3.3 km || 
|-id=551 bgcolor=#d6d6d6
| 345551 ||  || — || September 14, 2006 || Catalina || CSS || — || align=right | 3.5 km || 
|-id=552 bgcolor=#d6d6d6
| 345552 ||  || — || September 14, 2006 || Catalina || CSS || — || align=right | 3.7 km || 
|-id=553 bgcolor=#d6d6d6
| 345553 ||  || — || September 15, 2006 || Catalina || CSS || — || align=right | 4.9 km || 
|-id=554 bgcolor=#d6d6d6
| 345554 ||  || — || September 15, 2006 || Kitt Peak || Spacewatch || — || align=right | 2.4 km || 
|-id=555 bgcolor=#d6d6d6
| 345555 ||  || — || September 15, 2006 || Catalina || CSS || Tj (2.93) || align=right | 3.5 km || 
|-id=556 bgcolor=#d6d6d6
| 345556 ||  || — || August 29, 2006 || Catalina || CSS || — || align=right | 4.1 km || 
|-id=557 bgcolor=#d6d6d6
| 345557 ||  || — || September 14, 2006 || Kitt Peak || Spacewatch || LIX || align=right | 3.5 km || 
|-id=558 bgcolor=#d6d6d6
| 345558 ||  || — || September 14, 2006 || Kitt Peak || Spacewatch || THM || align=right | 2.7 km || 
|-id=559 bgcolor=#d6d6d6
| 345559 ||  || — || September 11, 2006 || Catalina || CSS || — || align=right | 7.6 km || 
|-id=560 bgcolor=#d6d6d6
| 345560 ||  || — || September 13, 2006 || Palomar || NEAT || — || align=right | 2.6 km || 
|-id=561 bgcolor=#d6d6d6
| 345561 ||  || — || September 15, 2006 || Kitt Peak || Spacewatch || — || align=right | 4.7 km || 
|-id=562 bgcolor=#d6d6d6
| 345562 ||  || — || September 15, 2006 || Kitt Peak || Spacewatch || — || align=right | 3.0 km || 
|-id=563 bgcolor=#d6d6d6
| 345563 ||  || — || September 15, 2006 || Kitt Peak || Spacewatch || THM || align=right | 1.9 km || 
|-id=564 bgcolor=#d6d6d6
| 345564 ||  || — || September 15, 2006 || Kitt Peak || Spacewatch || — || align=right | 3.1 km || 
|-id=565 bgcolor=#d6d6d6
| 345565 ||  || — || September 15, 2006 || Kitt Peak || Spacewatch || — || align=right | 2.9 km || 
|-id=566 bgcolor=#d6d6d6
| 345566 ||  || — || September 15, 2006 || Kitt Peak || Spacewatch || — || align=right | 3.4 km || 
|-id=567 bgcolor=#d6d6d6
| 345567 ||  || — || September 15, 2006 || Kitt Peak || Spacewatch || THM || align=right | 2.2 km || 
|-id=568 bgcolor=#d6d6d6
| 345568 ||  || — || September 15, 2006 || Kitt Peak || Spacewatch || — || align=right | 3.3 km || 
|-id=569 bgcolor=#d6d6d6
| 345569 ||  || — || September 15, 2006 || Kitt Peak || Spacewatch || HYG || align=right | 2.6 km || 
|-id=570 bgcolor=#d6d6d6
| 345570 ||  || — || February 22, 2003 || Palomar || NEAT || EOS || align=right | 2.6 km || 
|-id=571 bgcolor=#d6d6d6
| 345571 ||  || — || September 11, 2006 || Apache Point || A. C. Becker || — || align=right | 2.9 km || 
|-id=572 bgcolor=#d6d6d6
| 345572 ||  || — || September 14, 2006 || Kitt Peak || Spacewatch || EOS || align=right | 2.2 km || 
|-id=573 bgcolor=#d6d6d6
| 345573 ||  || — || September 14, 2006 || Mauna Kea || J. Masiero || — || align=right | 3.5 km || 
|-id=574 bgcolor=#d6d6d6
| 345574 ||  || — || September 14, 2006 || Mauna Kea || J. Masiero || — || align=right | 3.1 km || 
|-id=575 bgcolor=#d6d6d6
| 345575 ||  || — || September 16, 2006 || Catalina || CSS || — || align=right | 3.2 km || 
|-id=576 bgcolor=#d6d6d6
| 345576 ||  || — || September 16, 2006 || Anderson Mesa || LONEOS || — || align=right | 3.5 km || 
|-id=577 bgcolor=#d6d6d6
| 345577 ||  || — || September 16, 2006 || Catalina || CSS || — || align=right | 5.2 km || 
|-id=578 bgcolor=#d6d6d6
| 345578 ||  || — || September 17, 2006 || Catalina || CSS || — || align=right | 3.9 km || 
|-id=579 bgcolor=#d6d6d6
| 345579 ||  || — || September 17, 2006 || Kitt Peak || Spacewatch || — || align=right | 3.4 km || 
|-id=580 bgcolor=#d6d6d6
| 345580 ||  || — || September 16, 2006 || Catalina || CSS || — || align=right | 3.6 km || 
|-id=581 bgcolor=#d6d6d6
| 345581 ||  || — || September 16, 2006 || Catalina || CSS || EOS || align=right | 3.2 km || 
|-id=582 bgcolor=#d6d6d6
| 345582 ||  || — || September 17, 2006 || Kitt Peak || Spacewatch || — || align=right | 3.1 km || 
|-id=583 bgcolor=#d6d6d6
| 345583 ||  || — || September 18, 2006 || Kitt Peak || Spacewatch || — || align=right | 2.6 km || 
|-id=584 bgcolor=#d6d6d6
| 345584 ||  || — || September 19, 2006 || Catalina || CSS || — || align=right | 3.9 km || 
|-id=585 bgcolor=#d6d6d6
| 345585 ||  || — || September 20, 2006 || Cordell-Lorenz || Cordell–Lorenz Obs. || BRA || align=right | 2.1 km || 
|-id=586 bgcolor=#d6d6d6
| 345586 ||  || — || September 17, 2006 || Catalina || CSS || — || align=right | 3.7 km || 
|-id=587 bgcolor=#d6d6d6
| 345587 ||  || — || September 19, 2006 || Catalina || CSS || — || align=right | 4.0 km || 
|-id=588 bgcolor=#d6d6d6
| 345588 ||  || — || September 18, 2006 || Kitt Peak || Spacewatch || 629 || align=right | 2.1 km || 
|-id=589 bgcolor=#d6d6d6
| 345589 ||  || — || September 20, 2006 || Palomar || NEAT || — || align=right | 3.9 km || 
|-id=590 bgcolor=#d6d6d6
| 345590 ||  || — || September 19, 2006 || Kitt Peak || Spacewatch || — || align=right | 3.6 km || 
|-id=591 bgcolor=#d6d6d6
| 345591 ||  || — || September 19, 2006 || Kitt Peak || Spacewatch || THM || align=right | 2.3 km || 
|-id=592 bgcolor=#d6d6d6
| 345592 ||  || — || September 19, 2006 || Kitt Peak || Spacewatch || THM || align=right | 2.2 km || 
|-id=593 bgcolor=#d6d6d6
| 345593 ||  || — || September 19, 2006 || Kitt Peak || Spacewatch || THM || align=right | 3.3 km || 
|-id=594 bgcolor=#d6d6d6
| 345594 ||  || — || September 18, 2006 || Kitt Peak || Spacewatch || — || align=right | 3.2 km || 
|-id=595 bgcolor=#d6d6d6
| 345595 ||  || — || September 18, 2006 || Kitt Peak || Spacewatch || VER || align=right | 2.8 km || 
|-id=596 bgcolor=#d6d6d6
| 345596 ||  || — || September 18, 2006 || Kitt Peak || Spacewatch || THM || align=right | 2.4 km || 
|-id=597 bgcolor=#d6d6d6
| 345597 ||  || — || September 18, 2006 || Kitt Peak || Spacewatch || URS || align=right | 4.2 km || 
|-id=598 bgcolor=#d6d6d6
| 345598 ||  || — || September 19, 2006 || Kitt Peak || Spacewatch || — || align=right | 3.1 km || 
|-id=599 bgcolor=#d6d6d6
| 345599 ||  || — || September 24, 2006 || Kitt Peak || Spacewatch || LIX || align=right | 3.9 km || 
|-id=600 bgcolor=#d6d6d6
| 345600 ||  || — || September 18, 2006 || Anderson Mesa || LONEOS || — || align=right | 3.2 km || 
|}

345601–345700 

|-bgcolor=#d6d6d6
| 345601 ||  || — || September 20, 2006 || Catalina || CSS || — || align=right | 3.5 km || 
|-id=602 bgcolor=#d6d6d6
| 345602 ||  || — || September 16, 2006 || Catalina || CSS || — || align=right | 4.3 km || 
|-id=603 bgcolor=#d6d6d6
| 345603 ||  || — || September 21, 2006 || Anderson Mesa || LONEOS || — || align=right | 3.2 km || 
|-id=604 bgcolor=#d6d6d6
| 345604 ||  || — || September 22, 2006 || Catalina || CSS || — || align=right | 3.5 km || 
|-id=605 bgcolor=#d6d6d6
| 345605 ||  || — || September 25, 2006 || Kitt Peak || Spacewatch || — || align=right | 3.3 km || 
|-id=606 bgcolor=#d6d6d6
| 345606 ||  || — || September 25, 2006 || Kitt Peak || Spacewatch || — || align=right | 2.6 km || 
|-id=607 bgcolor=#d6d6d6
| 345607 ||  || — || September 25, 2006 || Kitt Peak || Spacewatch || KOR || align=right | 1.9 km || 
|-id=608 bgcolor=#d6d6d6
| 345608 ||  || — || September 25, 2006 || Mount Lemmon || Mount Lemmon Survey || THM || align=right | 2.3 km || 
|-id=609 bgcolor=#d6d6d6
| 345609 ||  || — || September 25, 2006 || Mount Lemmon || Mount Lemmon Survey || — || align=right | 3.6 km || 
|-id=610 bgcolor=#d6d6d6
| 345610 ||  || — || September 26, 2006 || Mount Lemmon || Mount Lemmon Survey || — || align=right | 3.2 km || 
|-id=611 bgcolor=#d6d6d6
| 345611 ||  || — || September 25, 2006 || Mount Lemmon || Mount Lemmon Survey || — || align=right | 3.1 km || 
|-id=612 bgcolor=#d6d6d6
| 345612 ||  || — || September 25, 2006 || Mount Lemmon || Mount Lemmon Survey || — || align=right | 2.3 km || 
|-id=613 bgcolor=#d6d6d6
| 345613 ||  || — || September 25, 2006 || Kitt Peak || Spacewatch || — || align=right | 3.5 km || 
|-id=614 bgcolor=#d6d6d6
| 345614 ||  || — || September 26, 2006 || Mount Lemmon || Mount Lemmon Survey || — || align=right | 2.9 km || 
|-id=615 bgcolor=#d6d6d6
| 345615 ||  || — || September 27, 2006 || Catalina || CSS || AEG || align=right | 3.1 km || 
|-id=616 bgcolor=#d6d6d6
| 345616 ||  || — || September 27, 2006 || Kitt Peak || Spacewatch || EOS || align=right | 2.7 km || 
|-id=617 bgcolor=#d6d6d6
| 345617 ||  || — || September 26, 2006 || Kitt Peak || Spacewatch || VER || align=right | 2.7 km || 
|-id=618 bgcolor=#d6d6d6
| 345618 ||  || — || September 26, 2006 || Kitt Peak || Spacewatch || VER || align=right | 2.1 km || 
|-id=619 bgcolor=#d6d6d6
| 345619 ||  || — || September 26, 2006 || Kitt Peak || Spacewatch || THM || align=right | 2.1 km || 
|-id=620 bgcolor=#d6d6d6
| 345620 ||  || — || September 26, 2006 || Kitt Peak || Spacewatch || HYG || align=right | 4.6 km || 
|-id=621 bgcolor=#d6d6d6
| 345621 ||  || — || September 26, 2006 || Mount Lemmon || Mount Lemmon Survey || — || align=right | 2.5 km || 
|-id=622 bgcolor=#d6d6d6
| 345622 ||  || — || September 26, 2006 || Mount Lemmon || Mount Lemmon Survey || THM || align=right | 2.4 km || 
|-id=623 bgcolor=#d6d6d6
| 345623 ||  || — || September 26, 2006 || Kitt Peak || Spacewatch || — || align=right | 2.9 km || 
|-id=624 bgcolor=#d6d6d6
| 345624 ||  || — || September 26, 2006 || Kitt Peak || Spacewatch || HYG || align=right | 6.4 km || 
|-id=625 bgcolor=#d6d6d6
| 345625 ||  || — || September 26, 2006 || Socorro || LINEAR || LIX || align=right | 4.5 km || 
|-id=626 bgcolor=#d6d6d6
| 345626 ||  || — || September 26, 2006 || Socorro || LINEAR || — || align=right | 4.7 km || 
|-id=627 bgcolor=#d6d6d6
| 345627 ||  || — || September 22, 2006 || Anderson Mesa || LONEOS || — || align=right | 3.8 km || 
|-id=628 bgcolor=#d6d6d6
| 345628 ||  || — || September 26, 2006 || Catalina || CSS || — || align=right | 2.9 km || 
|-id=629 bgcolor=#d6d6d6
| 345629 ||  || — || September 26, 2006 || Kitt Peak || Spacewatch || HYG || align=right | 3.9 km || 
|-id=630 bgcolor=#d6d6d6
| 345630 ||  || — || September 27, 2006 || Kitt Peak || Spacewatch || — || align=right | 3.6 km || 
|-id=631 bgcolor=#d6d6d6
| 345631 ||  || — || September 27, 2006 || Kitt Peak || Spacewatch || — || align=right | 3.5 km || 
|-id=632 bgcolor=#d6d6d6
| 345632 ||  || — || September 27, 2006 || Kitt Peak || Spacewatch || — || align=right | 3.8 km || 
|-id=633 bgcolor=#d6d6d6
| 345633 ||  || — || September 27, 2006 || Kitt Peak || Spacewatch || — || align=right | 4.6 km || 
|-id=634 bgcolor=#d6d6d6
| 345634 ||  || — || September 27, 2006 || Kitt Peak || Spacewatch || VER || align=right | 3.8 km || 
|-id=635 bgcolor=#d6d6d6
| 345635 ||  || — || September 28, 2006 || Kitt Peak || Spacewatch || VER || align=right | 3.1 km || 
|-id=636 bgcolor=#d6d6d6
| 345636 ||  || — || September 29, 2006 || Anderson Mesa || LONEOS || LIX || align=right | 4.1 km || 
|-id=637 bgcolor=#d6d6d6
| 345637 ||  || — || October 24, 1995 || Kitt Peak || Spacewatch || CRO || align=right | 2.4 km || 
|-id=638 bgcolor=#d6d6d6
| 345638 ||  || — || September 30, 2006 || Socorro || LINEAR || THB || align=right | 3.6 km || 
|-id=639 bgcolor=#d6d6d6
| 345639 ||  || — || September 30, 2006 || Catalina || CSS || — || align=right | 4.1 km || 
|-id=640 bgcolor=#d6d6d6
| 345640 ||  || — || September 30, 2006 || Catalina || CSS || — || align=right | 4.2 km || 
|-id=641 bgcolor=#d6d6d6
| 345641 ||  || — || September 16, 2006 || Apache Point || A. C. Becker || — || align=right | 2.7 km || 
|-id=642 bgcolor=#d6d6d6
| 345642 ||  || — || September 16, 2006 || Apache Point || A. C. Becker || — || align=right | 3.0 km || 
|-id=643 bgcolor=#d6d6d6
| 345643 ||  || — || September 29, 2006 || Apache Point || A. C. Becker || — || align=right | 3.6 km || 
|-id=644 bgcolor=#d6d6d6
| 345644 ||  || — || September 29, 2006 || Apache Point || A. C. Becker || — || align=right | 3.2 km || 
|-id=645 bgcolor=#d6d6d6
| 345645 ||  || — || September 29, 2006 || Apache Point || A. C. Becker || CRO || align=right | 3.8 km || 
|-id=646 bgcolor=#FFC2E0
| 345646 ||  || — || October 2, 2006 || Mount Lemmon || Mount Lemmon Survey || AMO || align=right data-sort-value="0.41" | 410 m || 
|-id=647 bgcolor=#d6d6d6
| 345647 ||  || — || October 2, 2006 || Mount Lemmon || Mount Lemmon Survey || THB || align=right | 3.3 km || 
|-id=648 bgcolor=#d6d6d6
| 345648 Adyendre ||  ||  || October 1, 2006 || Piszkéstető || K. Sárneczky, B. Csák || VER || align=right | 3.1 km || 
|-id=649 bgcolor=#d6d6d6
| 345649 ||  || — || October 10, 2006 || Farra d'Isonzo || Farra d'Isonzo || — || align=right | 3.4 km || 
|-id=650 bgcolor=#d6d6d6
| 345650 ||  || — || October 11, 2006 || Kitt Peak || Spacewatch || MEL || align=right | 4.3 km || 
|-id=651 bgcolor=#d6d6d6
| 345651 ||  || — || October 11, 2006 || Kitt Peak || Spacewatch || — || align=right | 3.8 km || 
|-id=652 bgcolor=#d6d6d6
| 345652 ||  || — || October 11, 2006 || Kitt Peak || Spacewatch || — || align=right | 3.7 km || 
|-id=653 bgcolor=#d6d6d6
| 345653 ||  || — || October 12, 2006 || Kitt Peak || Spacewatch || URS || align=right | 4.3 km || 
|-id=654 bgcolor=#d6d6d6
| 345654 ||  || — || October 12, 2006 || Palomar || NEAT || HYG || align=right | 3.1 km || 
|-id=655 bgcolor=#d6d6d6
| 345655 ||  || — || October 13, 2006 || Kitt Peak || Spacewatch || — || align=right | 5.4 km || 
|-id=656 bgcolor=#d6d6d6
| 345656 ||  || — || October 11, 2006 || Palomar || NEAT || — || align=right | 4.1 km || 
|-id=657 bgcolor=#fefefe
| 345657 ||  || — || October 11, 2006 || Palomar || NEAT || — || align=right data-sort-value="0.78" | 780 m || 
|-id=658 bgcolor=#d6d6d6
| 345658 ||  || — || October 12, 2006 || Palomar || NEAT || — || align=right | 2.4 km || 
|-id=659 bgcolor=#d6d6d6
| 345659 ||  || — || October 13, 2006 || Kitt Peak || Spacewatch || VER || align=right | 3.2 km || 
|-id=660 bgcolor=#d6d6d6
| 345660 ||  || — || October 14, 2006 || Lulin Observatory || C.-S. Lin, Q.-z. Ye || HYG || align=right | 3.3 km || 
|-id=661 bgcolor=#d6d6d6
| 345661 ||  || — || October 15, 2006 || Kitt Peak || Spacewatch || EOS || align=right | 2.6 km || 
|-id=662 bgcolor=#d6d6d6
| 345662 ||  || — || October 3, 2006 || Apache Point || A. C. Becker || — || align=right | 3.0 km || 
|-id=663 bgcolor=#d6d6d6
| 345663 ||  || — || October 3, 2006 || Apache Point || A. C. Becker || — || align=right | 3.2 km || 
|-id=664 bgcolor=#d6d6d6
| 345664 ||  || — || October 11, 2006 || Palomar || NEAT || — || align=right | 3.2 km || 
|-id=665 bgcolor=#d6d6d6
| 345665 ||  || — || October 16, 2006 || Catalina || CSS || — || align=right | 3.3 km || 
|-id=666 bgcolor=#d6d6d6
| 345666 ||  || — || October 16, 2006 || Kitt Peak || Spacewatch || — || align=right | 3.9 km || 
|-id=667 bgcolor=#fefefe
| 345667 ||  || — || October 16, 2006 || Kitt Peak || Spacewatch || — || align=right data-sort-value="0.52" | 520 m || 
|-id=668 bgcolor=#d6d6d6
| 345668 ||  || — || October 16, 2006 || Kitt Peak || Spacewatch || HYG || align=right | 3.6 km || 
|-id=669 bgcolor=#d6d6d6
| 345669 ||  || — || October 16, 2006 || Kitt Peak || Spacewatch || — || align=right | 3.4 km || 
|-id=670 bgcolor=#d6d6d6
| 345670 ||  || — || October 16, 2006 || Kitt Peak || Spacewatch || HYG || align=right | 3.6 km || 
|-id=671 bgcolor=#d6d6d6
| 345671 ||  || — || October 16, 2006 || Kitt Peak || Spacewatch || — || align=right | 3.2 km || 
|-id=672 bgcolor=#d6d6d6
| 345672 ||  || — || October 18, 2006 || Kitt Peak || Spacewatch || EOS || align=right | 2.3 km || 
|-id=673 bgcolor=#d6d6d6
| 345673 ||  || — || September 17, 2006 || Catalina || CSS || EOS || align=right | 2.3 km || 
|-id=674 bgcolor=#d6d6d6
| 345674 ||  || — || October 16, 2006 || Catalina || CSS || EOS || align=right | 2.6 km || 
|-id=675 bgcolor=#d6d6d6
| 345675 ||  || — || October 16, 2006 || Catalina || CSS || — || align=right | 3.4 km || 
|-id=676 bgcolor=#d6d6d6
| 345676 ||  || — || October 16, 2006 || Kitt Peak || Spacewatch || — || align=right | 3.8 km || 
|-id=677 bgcolor=#d6d6d6
| 345677 ||  || — || September 26, 2006 || Kitt Peak || Spacewatch || — || align=right | 3.5 km || 
|-id=678 bgcolor=#d6d6d6
| 345678 ||  || — || October 18, 2006 || Kitt Peak || Spacewatch || — || align=right | 4.0 km || 
|-id=679 bgcolor=#d6d6d6
| 345679 ||  || — || October 18, 2006 || Kitt Peak || Spacewatch || — || align=right | 2.7 km || 
|-id=680 bgcolor=#d6d6d6
| 345680 ||  || — || October 19, 2006 || Kitt Peak || Spacewatch || — || align=right | 3.0 km || 
|-id=681 bgcolor=#d6d6d6
| 345681 ||  || — || October 19, 2006 || Kitt Peak || Spacewatch || HYG || align=right | 2.7 km || 
|-id=682 bgcolor=#d6d6d6
| 345682 ||  || — || October 19, 2006 || Kitt Peak || Spacewatch || VER || align=right | 2.3 km || 
|-id=683 bgcolor=#d6d6d6
| 345683 ||  || — || October 15, 2006 || Kitt Peak || Spacewatch || EOS || align=right | 2.8 km || 
|-id=684 bgcolor=#fefefe
| 345684 ||  || — || October 19, 2006 || Mount Lemmon || Mount Lemmon Survey || — || align=right data-sort-value="0.63" | 630 m || 
|-id=685 bgcolor=#d6d6d6
| 345685 ||  || — || October 20, 2006 || Kitt Peak || Spacewatch || — || align=right | 3.7 km || 
|-id=686 bgcolor=#d6d6d6
| 345686 ||  || — || October 20, 2006 || Kitt Peak || Spacewatch || — || align=right | 3.0 km || 
|-id=687 bgcolor=#d6d6d6
| 345687 ||  || — || October 20, 2006 || Catalina || CSS || — || align=right | 5.2 km || 
|-id=688 bgcolor=#d6d6d6
| 345688 ||  || — || October 21, 2006 || Catalina || CSS || HYG || align=right | 2.7 km || 
|-id=689 bgcolor=#d6d6d6
| 345689 ||  || — || October 21, 2006 || Mount Lemmon || Mount Lemmon Survey || — || align=right | 3.2 km || 
|-id=690 bgcolor=#d6d6d6
| 345690 ||  || — || October 21, 2006 || Mount Lemmon || Mount Lemmon Survey || — || align=right | 2.9 km || 
|-id=691 bgcolor=#d6d6d6
| 345691 ||  || — || October 21, 2006 || Mount Lemmon || Mount Lemmon Survey || — || align=right | 3.3 km || 
|-id=692 bgcolor=#d6d6d6
| 345692 ||  || — || October 16, 2006 || Catalina || CSS || — || align=right | 3.7 km || 
|-id=693 bgcolor=#d6d6d6
| 345693 ||  || — || October 19, 2006 || Catalina || CSS || — || align=right | 3.2 km || 
|-id=694 bgcolor=#d6d6d6
| 345694 ||  || — || October 19, 2006 || Catalina || CSS || — || align=right | 3.8 km || 
|-id=695 bgcolor=#d6d6d6
| 345695 ||  || — || September 17, 2006 || Catalina || CSS || EUP || align=right | 5.0 km || 
|-id=696 bgcolor=#d6d6d6
| 345696 ||  || — || October 19, 2006 || Catalina || CSS || URS || align=right | 5.5 km || 
|-id=697 bgcolor=#d6d6d6
| 345697 ||  || — || October 17, 2006 || Catalina || CSS || VER || align=right | 3.7 km || 
|-id=698 bgcolor=#d6d6d6
| 345698 ||  || — || October 27, 2006 || Mount Lemmon || Mount Lemmon Survey || — || align=right | 2.8 km || 
|-id=699 bgcolor=#d6d6d6
| 345699 ||  || — || October 27, 2006 || Mount Lemmon || Mount Lemmon Survey || 7:4 || align=right | 2.6 km || 
|-id=700 bgcolor=#d6d6d6
| 345700 ||  || — || October 27, 2006 || Kitt Peak || Spacewatch || — || align=right | 6.0 km || 
|}

345701–345800 

|-bgcolor=#d6d6d6
| 345701 ||  || — || September 14, 2006 || Kitt Peak || Spacewatch || — || align=right | 2.6 km || 
|-id=702 bgcolor=#d6d6d6
| 345702 ||  || — || October 27, 2006 || Mauna Kea || P. A. Wiegert || — || align=right | 2.9 km || 
|-id=703 bgcolor=#d6d6d6
| 345703 ||  || — || October 21, 2006 || Kitt Peak || Spacewatch || — || align=right | 3.1 km || 
|-id=704 bgcolor=#fefefe
| 345704 ||  || — || November 9, 2006 || Kitt Peak || Spacewatch || — || align=right data-sort-value="0.81" | 810 m || 
|-id=705 bgcolor=#FFC2E0
| 345705 ||  || — || November 15, 2006 || Catalina || CSS || ATE || align=right data-sort-value="0.37" | 370 m || 
|-id=706 bgcolor=#d6d6d6
| 345706 ||  || — || November 9, 2006 || Kitt Peak || Spacewatch || — || align=right | 4.0 km || 
|-id=707 bgcolor=#d6d6d6
| 345707 ||  || — || September 14, 2006 || Kitt Peak || Spacewatch || THM || align=right | 2.5 km || 
|-id=708 bgcolor=#d6d6d6
| 345708 ||  || — || November 14, 2006 || Kitt Peak || Spacewatch || — || align=right | 3.8 km || 
|-id=709 bgcolor=#d6d6d6
| 345709 ||  || — || November 15, 2006 || Catalina || CSS || — || align=right | 4.5 km || 
|-id=710 bgcolor=#d6d6d6
| 345710 ||  || — || November 15, 2006 || Kitt Peak || Spacewatch || THM || align=right | 2.8 km || 
|-id=711 bgcolor=#d6d6d6
| 345711 ||  || — || November 9, 2006 || Palomar || NEAT || — || align=right | 4.2 km || 
|-id=712 bgcolor=#d6d6d6
| 345712 ||  || — || November 1, 2006 || Kitt Peak || Spacewatch || — || align=right | 2.9 km || 
|-id=713 bgcolor=#d6d6d6
| 345713 ||  || — || November 18, 2006 || Socorro || LINEAR || TIR || align=right | 3.3 km || 
|-id=714 bgcolor=#d6d6d6
| 345714 ||  || — || November 18, 2006 || Kitt Peak || Spacewatch || — || align=right | 2.7 km || 
|-id=715 bgcolor=#d6d6d6
| 345715 ||  || — || November 20, 2006 || Socorro || LINEAR || 7:4 || align=right | 4.4 km || 
|-id=716 bgcolor=#d6d6d6
| 345716 ||  || — || November 24, 2006 || Mount Lemmon || Mount Lemmon Survey || — || align=right | 2.8 km || 
|-id=717 bgcolor=#d6d6d6
| 345717 ||  || — || November 10, 2006 || Kitt Peak || Spacewatch || — || align=right | 3.3 km || 
|-id=718 bgcolor=#d6d6d6
| 345718 ||  || — || December 8, 2006 || Palomar || NEAT || — || align=right | 4.1 km || 
|-id=719 bgcolor=#d6d6d6
| 345719 ||  || — || December 9, 2006 || Kitt Peak || Spacewatch || EUP || align=right | 6.6 km || 
|-id=720 bgcolor=#fefefe
| 345720 Monte Vigese ||  ||  || December 12, 2006 || San Marcello || L. Tesi, M. Mazzucato || — || align=right data-sort-value="0.96" | 960 m || 
|-id=721 bgcolor=#fefefe
| 345721 ||  || — || December 27, 2006 || Mount Lemmon || Mount Lemmon Survey || — || align=right | 1.0 km || 
|-id=722 bgcolor=#FFC2E0
| 345722 ||  || — || January 21, 2007 || Socorro || LINEAR || ATE +1km || align=right data-sort-value="0.65" | 650 m || 
|-id=723 bgcolor=#fefefe
| 345723 ||  || — || January 24, 2007 || Mount Lemmon || Mount Lemmon Survey || — || align=right data-sort-value="0.66" | 660 m || 
|-id=724 bgcolor=#fefefe
| 345724 ||  || — || January 25, 2007 || Catalina || CSS || FLO || align=right data-sort-value="0.67" | 670 m || 
|-id=725 bgcolor=#fefefe
| 345725 ||  || — || January 27, 2007 || Mount Lemmon || Mount Lemmon Survey || FLO || align=right data-sort-value="0.53" | 530 m || 
|-id=726 bgcolor=#fefefe
| 345726 ||  || — || January 27, 2007 || Kitt Peak || Spacewatch || NYS || align=right data-sort-value="0.61" | 610 m || 
|-id=727 bgcolor=#fefefe
| 345727 ||  || — || January 9, 2007 || Kitt Peak || Spacewatch || FLO || align=right data-sort-value="0.72" | 720 m || 
|-id=728 bgcolor=#fefefe
| 345728 ||  || — || February 6, 2007 || Kitt Peak || Spacewatch || — || align=right | 1.1 km || 
|-id=729 bgcolor=#fefefe
| 345729 ||  || — || February 8, 2007 || Kitt Peak || Spacewatch || FLO || align=right data-sort-value="0.61" | 610 m || 
|-id=730 bgcolor=#fefefe
| 345730 ||  || — || February 8, 2007 || Kitt Peak || Spacewatch || — || align=right data-sort-value="0.80" | 800 m || 
|-id=731 bgcolor=#fefefe
| 345731 ||  || — || February 15, 2007 || Catalina || CSS || FLO || align=right data-sort-value="0.84" | 840 m || 
|-id=732 bgcolor=#fefefe
| 345732 ||  || — || February 10, 2007 || Mount Lemmon || Mount Lemmon Survey || V || align=right data-sort-value="0.62" | 620 m || 
|-id=733 bgcolor=#fefefe
| 345733 ||  || — || February 17, 2007 || Kitt Peak || Spacewatch || NYS || align=right data-sort-value="0.79" | 790 m || 
|-id=734 bgcolor=#fefefe
| 345734 ||  || — || August 31, 2005 || Kitt Peak || Spacewatch || — || align=right data-sort-value="0.86" | 860 m || 
|-id=735 bgcolor=#fefefe
| 345735 ||  || — || February 17, 2007 || Kitt Peak || Spacewatch || — || align=right data-sort-value="0.75" | 750 m || 
|-id=736 bgcolor=#fefefe
| 345736 ||  || — || February 21, 2007 || Bergisch Gladbach || W. Bickel || FLO || align=right data-sort-value="0.62" | 620 m || 
|-id=737 bgcolor=#E9E9E9
| 345737 ||  || — || February 19, 2007 || Mount Lemmon || Mount Lemmon Survey || JUN || align=right | 1.2 km || 
|-id=738 bgcolor=#fefefe
| 345738 ||  || — || February 21, 2007 || Kitt Peak || Spacewatch || — || align=right | 1.1 km || 
|-id=739 bgcolor=#fefefe
| 345739 ||  || — || February 21, 2007 || Kitt Peak || Spacewatch || MAS || align=right data-sort-value="0.82" | 820 m || 
|-id=740 bgcolor=#fefefe
| 345740 ||  || — || August 21, 2004 || Siding Spring || SSS || NYS || align=right data-sort-value="0.63" | 630 m || 
|-id=741 bgcolor=#fefefe
| 345741 ||  || — || February 23, 2007 || Socorro || LINEAR || V || align=right data-sort-value="0.68" | 680 m || 
|-id=742 bgcolor=#fefefe
| 345742 ||  || — || February 27, 2007 || Kitt Peak || Spacewatch || — || align=right data-sort-value="0.74" | 740 m || 
|-id=743 bgcolor=#fefefe
| 345743 ||  || — || February 23, 2007 || Mount Lemmon || Mount Lemmon Survey || — || align=right data-sort-value="0.68" | 680 m || 
|-id=744 bgcolor=#fefefe
| 345744 ||  || — || February 25, 2007 || Mount Lemmon || Mount Lemmon Survey || — || align=right | 1.1 km || 
|-id=745 bgcolor=#fefefe
| 345745 ||  || — || February 22, 2007 || Kitt Peak || Spacewatch || V || align=right data-sort-value="0.68" | 680 m || 
|-id=746 bgcolor=#fefefe
| 345746 ||  || — || March 9, 2007 || Catalina || CSS || NYS || align=right data-sort-value="0.74" | 740 m || 
|-id=747 bgcolor=#fefefe
| 345747 ||  || — || March 9, 2007 || Mount Lemmon || Mount Lemmon Survey || — || align=right data-sort-value="0.65" | 650 m || 
|-id=748 bgcolor=#fefefe
| 345748 ||  || — || March 9, 2007 || Kitt Peak || Spacewatch || — || align=right data-sort-value="0.71" | 710 m || 
|-id=749 bgcolor=#fefefe
| 345749 ||  || — || March 9, 2007 || Kitt Peak || Spacewatch || FLO || align=right data-sort-value="0.68" | 680 m || 
|-id=750 bgcolor=#fefefe
| 345750 ||  || — || March 9, 2007 || Catalina || CSS || LCI || align=right | 1.1 km || 
|-id=751 bgcolor=#fefefe
| 345751 ||  || — || March 11, 2007 || Dax || Dax Obs. || — || align=right | 1.1 km || 
|-id=752 bgcolor=#fefefe
| 345752 ||  || — || March 9, 2007 || Kitt Peak || Spacewatch || NYS || align=right data-sort-value="0.79" | 790 m || 
|-id=753 bgcolor=#C2FFFF
| 345753 ||  || — || March 12, 2007 || Mount Lemmon || Mount Lemmon Survey || L5 || align=right | 9.1 km || 
|-id=754 bgcolor=#fefefe
| 345754 ||  || — || March 10, 2007 || Kitt Peak || Spacewatch || — || align=right data-sort-value="0.78" | 780 m || 
|-id=755 bgcolor=#fefefe
| 345755 ||  || — || March 10, 2007 || Kitt Peak || Spacewatch || — || align=right data-sort-value="0.74" | 740 m || 
|-id=756 bgcolor=#fefefe
| 345756 ||  || — || March 10, 2007 || Kitt Peak || Spacewatch || — || align=right data-sort-value="0.80" | 800 m || 
|-id=757 bgcolor=#fefefe
| 345757 ||  || — || March 10, 2007 || Kitt Peak || Spacewatch || FLO || align=right data-sort-value="0.68" | 680 m || 
|-id=758 bgcolor=#fefefe
| 345758 ||  || — || March 10, 2007 || Kitt Peak || Spacewatch || MAS || align=right data-sort-value="0.76" | 760 m || 
|-id=759 bgcolor=#fefefe
| 345759 ||  || — || March 11, 2007 || Kitt Peak || Spacewatch || V || align=right data-sort-value="0.92" | 920 m || 
|-id=760 bgcolor=#fefefe
| 345760 ||  || — || March 11, 2007 || Anderson Mesa || LONEOS || V || align=right data-sort-value="0.95" | 950 m || 
|-id=761 bgcolor=#fefefe
| 345761 ||  || — || March 13, 2007 || Mount Lemmon || Mount Lemmon Survey || PHO || align=right | 1.5 km || 
|-id=762 bgcolor=#fefefe
| 345762 Jacquescoeur ||  ||  || March 13, 2007 || Saint-Sulpice || B. Christophe || MAS || align=right data-sort-value="0.67" | 670 m || 
|-id=763 bgcolor=#fefefe
| 345763 ||  || — || March 13, 2007 || San Marcello || Pistoia Mountains Obs. || — || align=right data-sort-value="0.90" | 900 m || 
|-id=764 bgcolor=#fefefe
| 345764 ||  || — || March 10, 2007 || Mount Lemmon || Mount Lemmon Survey || FLO || align=right data-sort-value="0.66" | 660 m || 
|-id=765 bgcolor=#fefefe
| 345765 ||  || — || March 10, 2007 || Mount Lemmon || Mount Lemmon Survey || — || align=right data-sort-value="0.75" | 750 m || 
|-id=766 bgcolor=#fefefe
| 345766 ||  || — || March 11, 2007 || Mount Lemmon || Mount Lemmon Survey || — || align=right data-sort-value="0.73" | 730 m || 
|-id=767 bgcolor=#fefefe
| 345767 ||  || — || March 11, 2007 || Kitt Peak || Spacewatch || — || align=right | 1.2 km || 
|-id=768 bgcolor=#fefefe
| 345768 ||  || — || March 13, 2007 || Mount Lemmon || Mount Lemmon Survey || — || align=right data-sort-value="0.61" | 610 m || 
|-id=769 bgcolor=#fefefe
| 345769 ||  || — || March 13, 2007 || Mount Lemmon || Mount Lemmon Survey || — || align=right | 1.1 km || 
|-id=770 bgcolor=#fefefe
| 345770 ||  || — || March 13, 2007 || Mount Lemmon || Mount Lemmon Survey || MAS || align=right data-sort-value="0.78" | 780 m || 
|-id=771 bgcolor=#fefefe
| 345771 ||  || — || March 9, 2007 || Palomar || NEAT || FLO || align=right data-sort-value="0.82" | 820 m || 
|-id=772 bgcolor=#fefefe
| 345772 ||  || — || March 9, 2007 || Mount Lemmon || Mount Lemmon Survey || MAS || align=right data-sort-value="0.69" | 690 m || 
|-id=773 bgcolor=#fefefe
| 345773 ||  || — || March 9, 2007 || Mount Lemmon || Mount Lemmon Survey || V || align=right data-sort-value="0.68" | 680 m || 
|-id=774 bgcolor=#fefefe
| 345774 ||  || — || March 9, 2007 || Mount Lemmon || Mount Lemmon Survey || — || align=right data-sort-value="0.73" | 730 m || 
|-id=775 bgcolor=#C2FFFF
| 345775 ||  || — || March 9, 2007 || Mount Lemmon || Mount Lemmon Survey || L5 || align=right | 10 km || 
|-id=776 bgcolor=#fefefe
| 345776 ||  || — || March 12, 2007 || Kitt Peak || Spacewatch || — || align=right data-sort-value="0.71" | 710 m || 
|-id=777 bgcolor=#fefefe
| 345777 ||  || — || March 12, 2007 || Mount Lemmon || Mount Lemmon Survey || V || align=right data-sort-value="0.64" | 640 m || 
|-id=778 bgcolor=#fefefe
| 345778 ||  || — || March 12, 2007 || Kitt Peak || Spacewatch || — || align=right data-sort-value="0.88" | 880 m || 
|-id=779 bgcolor=#fefefe
| 345779 ||  || — || March 10, 2007 || Kitt Peak || Spacewatch || — || align=right data-sort-value="0.93" | 930 m || 
|-id=780 bgcolor=#fefefe
| 345780 ||  || — || March 14, 2007 || Kitt Peak || Spacewatch || FLO || align=right data-sort-value="0.80" | 800 m || 
|-id=781 bgcolor=#fefefe
| 345781 ||  || — || March 14, 2007 || Mount Lemmon || Mount Lemmon Survey || fast? || align=right | 1.1 km || 
|-id=782 bgcolor=#E9E9E9
| 345782 ||  || — || March 14, 2007 || Kitt Peak || Spacewatch || — || align=right | 1.6 km || 
|-id=783 bgcolor=#E9E9E9
| 345783 ||  || — || March 15, 2007 || Mount Lemmon || Mount Lemmon Survey || — || align=right | 1.2 km || 
|-id=784 bgcolor=#fefefe
| 345784 ||  || — || March 15, 2007 || Kitt Peak || Spacewatch || — || align=right data-sort-value="0.89" | 890 m || 
|-id=785 bgcolor=#fefefe
| 345785 ||  || — || March 14, 2007 || Socorro || LINEAR || — || align=right data-sort-value="0.86" | 860 m || 
|-id=786 bgcolor=#fefefe
| 345786 ||  || — || March 9, 2007 || Kitt Peak || Spacewatch || — || align=right data-sort-value="0.64" | 640 m || 
|-id=787 bgcolor=#fefefe
| 345787 ||  || — || October 25, 2005 || Kitt Peak || Spacewatch || FLO || align=right data-sort-value="0.87" | 870 m || 
|-id=788 bgcolor=#fefefe
| 345788 ||  || — || March 20, 2007 || Mount Lemmon || Mount Lemmon Survey || — || align=right data-sort-value="0.93" | 930 m || 
|-id=789 bgcolor=#fefefe
| 345789 ||  || — || March 20, 2007 || Kitt Peak || Spacewatch || — || align=right data-sort-value="0.79" | 790 m || 
|-id=790 bgcolor=#fefefe
| 345790 || 2007 GD || — || April 6, 2007 || Marly || P. Kocher || V || align=right data-sort-value="0.73" | 730 m || 
|-id=791 bgcolor=#fefefe
| 345791 ||  || — || April 13, 2007 || Altschwendt || W. Ries || MAS || align=right data-sort-value="0.83" | 830 m || 
|-id=792 bgcolor=#fefefe
| 345792 ||  || — || April 7, 2007 || Mount Lemmon || Mount Lemmon Survey || — || align=right data-sort-value="0.78" | 780 m || 
|-id=793 bgcolor=#fefefe
| 345793 ||  || — || April 11, 2007 || Kitt Peak || Spacewatch || — || align=right data-sort-value="0.98" | 980 m || 
|-id=794 bgcolor=#fefefe
| 345794 ||  || — || April 11, 2007 || Kitt Peak || Spacewatch || NYS || align=right data-sort-value="0.69" | 690 m || 
|-id=795 bgcolor=#E9E9E9
| 345795 ||  || — || April 11, 2007 || Kitt Peak || Spacewatch || — || align=right data-sort-value="0.90" | 900 m || 
|-id=796 bgcolor=#fefefe
| 345796 ||  || — || April 11, 2007 || Kitt Peak || Spacewatch || NYS || align=right data-sort-value="0.55" | 550 m || 
|-id=797 bgcolor=#E9E9E9
| 345797 ||  || — || April 14, 2007 || Kitt Peak || Spacewatch || — || align=right data-sort-value="0.84" | 840 m || 
|-id=798 bgcolor=#fefefe
| 345798 ||  || — || April 15, 2007 || Catalina || CSS || — || align=right | 1.0 km || 
|-id=799 bgcolor=#fefefe
| 345799 ||  || — || April 15, 2007 || Kitt Peak || Spacewatch || FLO || align=right data-sort-value="0.61" | 610 m || 
|-id=800 bgcolor=#fefefe
| 345800 ||  || — || April 15, 2007 || Catalina || CSS || V || align=right data-sort-value="0.89" | 890 m || 
|}

345801–345900 

|-bgcolor=#fefefe
| 345801 ||  || — || March 15, 2007 || Mount Lemmon || Mount Lemmon Survey || — || align=right | 1.3 km || 
|-id=802 bgcolor=#fefefe
| 345802 ||  || — || April 14, 2007 || Kitt Peak || Spacewatch || — || align=right | 1.1 km || 
|-id=803 bgcolor=#fefefe
| 345803 ||  || — || April 14, 2007 || Kitt Peak || Spacewatch || — || align=right | 1.8 km || 
|-id=804 bgcolor=#fefefe
| 345804 ||  || — || April 14, 2007 || Mount Lemmon || Mount Lemmon Survey || — || align=right data-sort-value="0.54" | 540 m || 
|-id=805 bgcolor=#E9E9E9
| 345805 ||  || — || April 14, 2007 || Kitt Peak || Spacewatch || — || align=right | 1.1 km || 
|-id=806 bgcolor=#fefefe
| 345806 ||  || — || April 15, 2007 || Catalina || CSS || — || align=right | 1.5 km || 
|-id=807 bgcolor=#fefefe
| 345807 ||  || — || April 14, 2007 || Kitt Peak || Spacewatch || — || align=right | 1.9 km || 
|-id=808 bgcolor=#fefefe
| 345808 ||  || — || April 15, 2007 || Kitt Peak || Spacewatch || V || align=right data-sort-value="0.79" | 790 m || 
|-id=809 bgcolor=#E9E9E9
| 345809 ||  || — || April 15, 2007 || Kitt Peak || Spacewatch || — || align=right | 1.0 km || 
|-id=810 bgcolor=#fefefe
| 345810 ||  || — || April 15, 2007 || Catalina || CSS || NYS || align=right data-sort-value="0.70" | 700 m || 
|-id=811 bgcolor=#E9E9E9
| 345811 ||  || — || April 11, 2007 || Kitt Peak || Spacewatch || — || align=right data-sort-value="0.92" | 920 m || 
|-id=812 bgcolor=#fefefe
| 345812 ||  || — || April 16, 2007 || Catalina || CSS || — || align=right | 2.3 km || 
|-id=813 bgcolor=#FFC2E0
| 345813 ||  || — || April 20, 2007 || Catalina || CSS || APO +1km || align=right | 1.4 km || 
|-id=814 bgcolor=#fefefe
| 345814 ||  || — || April 19, 2007 || Mount Lemmon || Mount Lemmon Survey || — || align=right data-sort-value="0.86" | 860 m || 
|-id=815 bgcolor=#fefefe
| 345815 ||  || — || April 16, 2007 || Catalina || CSS || FLO || align=right data-sort-value="0.68" | 680 m || 
|-id=816 bgcolor=#fefefe
| 345816 ||  || — || April 16, 2007 || Catalina || CSS || — || align=right data-sort-value="0.90" | 900 m || 
|-id=817 bgcolor=#fefefe
| 345817 ||  || — || April 18, 2007 || Kitt Peak || Spacewatch || MAS || align=right data-sort-value="0.85" | 850 m || 
|-id=818 bgcolor=#fefefe
| 345818 ||  || — || April 18, 2007 || Kitt Peak || Spacewatch || — || align=right | 1.0 km || 
|-id=819 bgcolor=#fefefe
| 345819 ||  || — || April 18, 2007 || Kitt Peak || Spacewatch || — || align=right data-sort-value="0.69" | 690 m || 
|-id=820 bgcolor=#fefefe
| 345820 ||  || — || April 18, 2007 || Mount Lemmon || Mount Lemmon Survey || — || align=right data-sort-value="0.90" | 900 m || 
|-id=821 bgcolor=#fefefe
| 345821 ||  || — || April 18, 2007 || Mount Lemmon || Mount Lemmon Survey || — || align=right | 1.1 km || 
|-id=822 bgcolor=#fefefe
| 345822 ||  || — || April 22, 2007 || Kitt Peak || Spacewatch || V || align=right data-sort-value="0.82" | 820 m || 
|-id=823 bgcolor=#E9E9E9
| 345823 ||  || — || April 20, 2007 || Jarnac || Jarnac Obs. || — || align=right | 3.2 km || 
|-id=824 bgcolor=#fefefe
| 345824 ||  || — || April 23, 2007 || Kitt Peak || Spacewatch || — || align=right | 1.0 km || 
|-id=825 bgcolor=#fefefe
| 345825 ||  || — || April 24, 2007 || Kitt Peak || Spacewatch || — || align=right | 1.1 km || 
|-id=826 bgcolor=#E9E9E9
| 345826 ||  || — || April 27, 2007 || Kitt Peak || Spacewatch || GER || align=right | 1.8 km || 
|-id=827 bgcolor=#fefefe
| 345827 ||  || — || April 21, 2007 || Cerro Tololo || M. W. Buie || NYS || align=right data-sort-value="0.60" | 600 m || 
|-id=828 bgcolor=#fefefe
| 345828 ||  || — || May 6, 2007 || Kitt Peak || Spacewatch || NYS || align=right data-sort-value="0.91" | 910 m || 
|-id=829 bgcolor=#fefefe
| 345829 ||  || — || May 7, 2007 || Kitt Peak || Spacewatch || — || align=right | 1.0 km || 
|-id=830 bgcolor=#fefefe
| 345830 ||  || — || May 9, 2007 || Mount Lemmon || Mount Lemmon Survey || — || align=right | 2.1 km || 
|-id=831 bgcolor=#E9E9E9
| 345831 ||  || — || April 23, 2007 || Mount Lemmon || Mount Lemmon Survey || MAR || align=right | 1.2 km || 
|-id=832 bgcolor=#fefefe
| 345832 ||  || — || May 9, 2007 || Catalina || CSS || V || align=right data-sort-value="0.92" | 920 m || 
|-id=833 bgcolor=#fefefe
| 345833 ||  || — || May 22, 2007 || Mount Lemmon || Mount Lemmon Survey || NYS || align=right data-sort-value="0.58" | 580 m || 
|-id=834 bgcolor=#E9E9E9
| 345834 ||  || — || May 22, 2007 || Tiki || S. F. Hönig, N. Teamo || — || align=right data-sort-value="0.94" | 940 m || 
|-id=835 bgcolor=#E9E9E9
| 345835 ||  || — || May 24, 2007 || Reedy Creek || J. Broughton || RAF || align=right | 1.6 km || 
|-id=836 bgcolor=#fefefe
| 345836 ||  || — || June 7, 2007 || Kitt Peak || Spacewatch || — || align=right data-sort-value="0.81" | 810 m || 
|-id=837 bgcolor=#E9E9E9
| 345837 ||  || — || June 8, 2007 || Kitt Peak || Spacewatch || MAR || align=right data-sort-value="0.96" | 960 m || 
|-id=838 bgcolor=#fefefe
| 345838 ||  || — || June 13, 2007 || Tiki || S. F. Hönig, N. Teamo || — || align=right | 1.5 km || 
|-id=839 bgcolor=#E9E9E9
| 345839 ||  || — || May 16, 2007 || Kitt Peak || Spacewatch || JUN || align=right | 1.1 km || 
|-id=840 bgcolor=#E9E9E9
| 345840 ||  || — || June 12, 2007 || Kitt Peak || Spacewatch || — || align=right | 1.3 km || 
|-id=841 bgcolor=#fefefe
| 345841 ||  || — || June 14, 2007 || Kitt Peak || Spacewatch || — || align=right | 1.3 km || 
|-id=842 bgcolor=#E9E9E9
| 345842 Alexparker ||  ||  || June 12, 2007 || Mauna Kea || D. D. Balam || PAD || align=right | 1.5 km || 
|-id=843 bgcolor=#fefefe
| 345843 ||  || — || June 16, 2007 || Kitt Peak || Spacewatch || V || align=right data-sort-value="0.86" | 860 m || 
|-id=844 bgcolor=#E9E9E9
| 345844 ||  || — || June 16, 2007 || Kitt Peak || Spacewatch || — || align=right | 2.6 km || 
|-id=845 bgcolor=#E9E9E9
| 345845 ||  || — || June 17, 2007 || Kitt Peak || Spacewatch || — || align=right | 1.6 km || 
|-id=846 bgcolor=#E9E9E9
| 345846 ||  || — || July 12, 2007 || La Sagra || OAM Obs. || ADE || align=right | 2.1 km || 
|-id=847 bgcolor=#E9E9E9
| 345847 ||  || — || July 19, 2007 || Tiki || S. F. Hönig, N. Teamo || — || align=right | 2.0 km || 
|-id=848 bgcolor=#E9E9E9
| 345848 ||  || — || July 18, 2007 || Andrushivka || Andrushivka Obs. || JUN || align=right | 1.4 km || 
|-id=849 bgcolor=#E9E9E9
| 345849 ||  || — || July 18, 2007 || Eskridge || G. Hug || — || align=right | 1.7 km || 
|-id=850 bgcolor=#E9E9E9
| 345850 ||  || — || June 22, 2007 || Kitt Peak || Spacewatch || INO || align=right | 1.1 km || 
|-id=851 bgcolor=#E9E9E9
| 345851 ||  || — || August 8, 2007 || Siding Spring || SSS || — || align=right | 2.4 km || 
|-id=852 bgcolor=#E9E9E9
| 345852 ||  || — || August 9, 2007 || Tiki || S. F. Hönig, N. Teamo || — || align=right | 2.6 km || 
|-id=853 bgcolor=#FFC2E0
| 345853 ||  || — || August 13, 2007 || Socorro || LINEAR || AMO +1km || align=right | 2.0 km || 
|-id=854 bgcolor=#E9E9E9
| 345854 ||  || — || August 8, 2007 || Socorro || LINEAR || — || align=right | 2.1 km || 
|-id=855 bgcolor=#E9E9E9
| 345855 ||  || — || July 16, 2007 || Socorro || LINEAR || — || align=right | 2.3 km || 
|-id=856 bgcolor=#E9E9E9
| 345856 ||  || — || August 9, 2007 || Socorro || LINEAR || — || align=right | 4.0 km || 
|-id=857 bgcolor=#E9E9E9
| 345857 ||  || — || August 8, 2007 || Socorro || LINEAR || — || align=right | 2.2 km || 
|-id=858 bgcolor=#E9E9E9
| 345858 ||  || — || August 14, 2007 || Bisei SG Center || BATTeRS || — || align=right | 2.5 km || 
|-id=859 bgcolor=#E9E9E9
| 345859 ||  || — || August 8, 2007 || Socorro || LINEAR || — || align=right | 2.0 km || 
|-id=860 bgcolor=#E9E9E9
| 345860 ||  || — || August 9, 2007 || Socorro || LINEAR || MAR || align=right | 1.4 km || 
|-id=861 bgcolor=#E9E9E9
| 345861 ||  || — || August 10, 2007 || Kitt Peak || Spacewatch || — || align=right | 1.8 km || 
|-id=862 bgcolor=#E9E9E9
| 345862 ||  || — || August 10, 2007 || Kitt Peak || Spacewatch || — || align=right | 1.8 km || 
|-id=863 bgcolor=#d6d6d6
| 345863 ||  || — || August 10, 2007 || Kitt Peak || Spacewatch || EOS || align=right | 2.2 km || 
|-id=864 bgcolor=#d6d6d6
| 345864 ||  || — || August 9, 2007 || Socorro || LINEAR || — || align=right | 4.0 km || 
|-id=865 bgcolor=#E9E9E9
| 345865 ||  || — || August 16, 2007 || Bisei SG Center || BATTeRS || EUN || align=right | 1.9 km || 
|-id=866 bgcolor=#E9E9E9
| 345866 ||  || — || May 24, 2007 || Catalina || CSS || — || align=right | 3.3 km || 
|-id=867 bgcolor=#E9E9E9
| 345867 ||  || — || August 18, 2007 || Mayhill || A. Lowe || JUN || align=right | 1.3 km || 
|-id=868 bgcolor=#E9E9E9
| 345868 Halicarnassus ||  ||  || August 19, 2007 || Vallemare di Borbona || V. S. Casulli || — || align=right | 2.4 km || 
|-id=869 bgcolor=#E9E9E9
| 345869 ||  || — || August 21, 2007 || Anderson Mesa || LONEOS || — || align=right | 2.4 km || 
|-id=870 bgcolor=#d6d6d6
| 345870 ||  || — || August 21, 2007 || Anderson Mesa || LONEOS || — || align=right | 2.7 km || 
|-id=871 bgcolor=#E9E9E9
| 345871 Xuguangxian ||  ||  || August 13, 2007 || XuYi || PMO NEO || — || align=right | 1.8 km || 
|-id=872 bgcolor=#E9E9E9
| 345872 ||  || — || August 22, 2007 || Socorro || LINEAR || — || align=right | 3.8 km || 
|-id=873 bgcolor=#E9E9E9
| 345873 ||  || — || August 23, 2007 || Kitt Peak || Spacewatch || — || align=right | 1.7 km || 
|-id=874 bgcolor=#E9E9E9
| 345874 ||  || — || August 24, 2007 || Kitt Peak || Spacewatch || — || align=right | 2.2 km || 
|-id=875 bgcolor=#E9E9E9
| 345875 ||  || — || August 21, 2007 || Anderson Mesa || LONEOS || — || align=right | 3.7 km || 
|-id=876 bgcolor=#E9E9E9
| 345876 ||  || — || September 4, 2007 || La Sagra || OAM Obs. || — || align=right | 1.5 km || 
|-id=877 bgcolor=#E9E9E9
| 345877 ||  || — || September 5, 2007 || Bergisch Gladbac || W. Bickel || AGN || align=right | 1.4 km || 
|-id=878 bgcolor=#E9E9E9
| 345878 ||  || — || September 3, 2007 || Catalina || CSS || — || align=right | 2.2 km || 
|-id=879 bgcolor=#E9E9E9
| 345879 ||  || — || September 11, 2007 || Vicques || M. Ory || — || align=right | 1.8 km || 
|-id=880 bgcolor=#d6d6d6
| 345880 ||  || — || September 4, 2007 || Mount Lemmon || Mount Lemmon Survey || EOS || align=right | 1.9 km || 
|-id=881 bgcolor=#E9E9E9
| 345881 ||  || — || September 5, 2007 || Catalina || CSS || — || align=right | 3.2 km || 
|-id=882 bgcolor=#E9E9E9
| 345882 ||  || — || September 9, 2007 || Kitt Peak || Spacewatch || NEM || align=right | 2.2 km || 
|-id=883 bgcolor=#E9E9E9
| 345883 ||  || — || September 9, 2007 || Kitt Peak || Spacewatch || — || align=right | 1.8 km || 
|-id=884 bgcolor=#d6d6d6
| 345884 ||  || — || September 9, 2007 || Kitt Peak || Spacewatch || — || align=right | 2.3 km || 
|-id=885 bgcolor=#d6d6d6
| 345885 ||  || — || September 9, 2007 || Kitt Peak || Spacewatch || — || align=right | 2.2 km || 
|-id=886 bgcolor=#E9E9E9
| 345886 ||  || — || September 10, 2007 || Catalina || CSS || NEM || align=right | 2.5 km || 
|-id=887 bgcolor=#E9E9E9
| 345887 ||  || — || September 10, 2007 || Mount Lemmon || Mount Lemmon Survey || — || align=right | 2.2 km || 
|-id=888 bgcolor=#E9E9E9
| 345888 ||  || — || September 10, 2007 || Kitt Peak || Spacewatch || — || align=right | 2.7 km || 
|-id=889 bgcolor=#E9E9E9
| 345889 ||  || — || September 10, 2007 || Kitt Peak || Spacewatch || NEM || align=right | 2.1 km || 
|-id=890 bgcolor=#E9E9E9
| 345890 ||  || — || August 10, 2007 || Kitt Peak || Spacewatch || — || align=right | 2.0 km || 
|-id=891 bgcolor=#E9E9E9
| 345891 ||  || — || September 10, 2007 || Mount Lemmon || Mount Lemmon Survey || — || align=right | 1.6 km || 
|-id=892 bgcolor=#E9E9E9
| 345892 ||  || — || September 10, 2007 || Mount Lemmon || Mount Lemmon Survey || — || align=right | 1.9 km || 
|-id=893 bgcolor=#E9E9E9
| 345893 ||  || — || September 10, 2007 || Kitt Peak || Spacewatch || — || align=right | 2.7 km || 
|-id=894 bgcolor=#E9E9E9
| 345894 ||  || — || September 10, 2007 || Mount Lemmon || Mount Lemmon Survey || NEM || align=right | 2.2 km || 
|-id=895 bgcolor=#E9E9E9
| 345895 ||  || — || September 10, 2007 || Mount Lemmon || Mount Lemmon Survey || — || align=right | 2.1 km || 
|-id=896 bgcolor=#d6d6d6
| 345896 ||  || — || October 30, 2002 || Kitt Peak || Spacewatch || — || align=right | 2.3 km || 
|-id=897 bgcolor=#E9E9E9
| 345897 ||  || — || September 10, 2007 || Kitt Peak || Spacewatch || — || align=right | 2.1 km || 
|-id=898 bgcolor=#E9E9E9
| 345898 ||  || — || September 10, 2007 || Kitt Peak || Spacewatch || — || align=right | 3.7 km || 
|-id=899 bgcolor=#E9E9E9
| 345899 ||  || — || September 11, 2007 || Catalina || CSS || JUN || align=right | 1.2 km || 
|-id=900 bgcolor=#d6d6d6
| 345900 ||  || — || September 11, 2007 || Mount Lemmon || Mount Lemmon Survey || EOS || align=right | 2.3 km || 
|}

345901–346000 

|-bgcolor=#E9E9E9
| 345901 ||  || — || September 11, 2007 || Kitt Peak || Spacewatch || — || align=right | 2.5 km || 
|-id=902 bgcolor=#E9E9E9
| 345902 ||  || — || September 11, 2007 || Kitt Peak || Spacewatch || — || align=right | 2.0 km || 
|-id=903 bgcolor=#d6d6d6
| 345903 ||  || — || September 11, 2007 || Purple Mountain || PMO NEO || — || align=right | 3.3 km || 
|-id=904 bgcolor=#E9E9E9
| 345904 ||  || — || September 12, 2007 || Mount Lemmon || Mount Lemmon Survey || PAD || align=right | 1.9 km || 
|-id=905 bgcolor=#E9E9E9
| 345905 ||  || — || September 12, 2007 || Mount Lemmon || Mount Lemmon Survey || HEN || align=right | 1.4 km || 
|-id=906 bgcolor=#E9E9E9
| 345906 ||  || — || September 13, 2007 || Socorro || LINEAR || GEF || align=right | 1.5 km || 
|-id=907 bgcolor=#E9E9E9
| 345907 ||  || — || September 12, 2007 || Catalina || CSS || — || align=right | 3.6 km || 
|-id=908 bgcolor=#E9E9E9
| 345908 ||  || — || September 12, 2007 || Goodricke-Pigott || R. A. Tucker || — || align=right | 2.6 km || 
|-id=909 bgcolor=#E9E9E9
| 345909 ||  || — || September 27, 2003 || Kitt Peak || Spacewatch || — || align=right | 1.4 km || 
|-id=910 bgcolor=#E9E9E9
| 345910 ||  || — || September 10, 2007 || Kitt Peak || Spacewatch || AGN || align=right | 1.0 km || 
|-id=911 bgcolor=#E9E9E9
| 345911 ||  || — || September 10, 2007 || Kitt Peak || Spacewatch || — || align=right | 1.4 km || 
|-id=912 bgcolor=#E9E9E9
| 345912 ||  || — || September 10, 2007 || Kitt Peak || Spacewatch || NEM || align=right | 2.4 km || 
|-id=913 bgcolor=#E9E9E9
| 345913 ||  || — || September 10, 2007 || Kitt Peak || Spacewatch || — || align=right | 2.3 km || 
|-id=914 bgcolor=#E9E9E9
| 345914 ||  || — || September 10, 2007 || Kitt Peak || Spacewatch || AST || align=right | 1.5 km || 
|-id=915 bgcolor=#E9E9E9
| 345915 ||  || — || September 10, 2007 || Kitt Peak || Spacewatch || NEM || align=right | 2.2 km || 
|-id=916 bgcolor=#d6d6d6
| 345916 ||  || — || September 10, 2007 || Kitt Peak || Spacewatch || — || align=right | 2.6 km || 
|-id=917 bgcolor=#E9E9E9
| 345917 ||  || — || September 10, 2007 || Kitt Peak || Spacewatch || — || align=right | 2.5 km || 
|-id=918 bgcolor=#E9E9E9
| 345918 ||  || — || September 10, 2007 || Kitt Peak || Spacewatch || — || align=right | 1.7 km || 
|-id=919 bgcolor=#E9E9E9
| 345919 ||  || — || September 11, 2007 || Mount Lemmon || Mount Lemmon Survey || — || align=right | 1.5 km || 
|-id=920 bgcolor=#E9E9E9
| 345920 ||  || — || September 9, 2007 || Kitt Peak || Spacewatch || — || align=right | 2.3 km || 
|-id=921 bgcolor=#d6d6d6
| 345921 ||  || — || September 12, 2007 || Kitt Peak || Spacewatch || KAR || align=right | 1.1 km || 
|-id=922 bgcolor=#E9E9E9
| 345922 ||  || — || September 9, 2007 || Kitt Peak || Spacewatch || — || align=right | 3.2 km || 
|-id=923 bgcolor=#E9E9E9
| 345923 ||  || — || September 10, 2007 || Kitt Peak || Spacewatch || — || align=right | 2.0 km || 
|-id=924 bgcolor=#E9E9E9
| 345924 ||  || — || September 12, 2007 || Kitt Peak || Spacewatch || AGN || align=right | 1.2 km || 
|-id=925 bgcolor=#E9E9E9
| 345925 ||  || — || September 12, 2007 || Kitt Peak || Spacewatch || MRX || align=right | 1.2 km || 
|-id=926 bgcolor=#d6d6d6
| 345926 ||  || — || September 8, 2007 || Mount Lemmon || Mount Lemmon Survey || ALA || align=right | 3.8 km || 
|-id=927 bgcolor=#E9E9E9
| 345927 ||  || — || September 12, 2007 || Catalina || CSS || HNA || align=right | 2.7 km || 
|-id=928 bgcolor=#E9E9E9
| 345928 ||  || — || September 12, 2007 || Catalina || CSS || — || align=right | 2.6 km || 
|-id=929 bgcolor=#E9E9E9
| 345929 ||  || — || September 12, 2007 || Anderson Mesa || LONEOS || — || align=right | 2.6 km || 
|-id=930 bgcolor=#E9E9E9
| 345930 ||  || — || August 21, 2007 || La Sagra || OAM Obs. || MAR || align=right | 1.5 km || 
|-id=931 bgcolor=#E9E9E9
| 345931 ||  || — || September 12, 2007 || Mount Lemmon || Mount Lemmon Survey || — || align=right | 2.1 km || 
|-id=932 bgcolor=#E9E9E9
| 345932 ||  || — || September 12, 2007 || Catalina || CSS || DOR || align=right | 2.5 km || 
|-id=933 bgcolor=#E9E9E9
| 345933 ||  || — || September 9, 2007 || Kitt Peak || Spacewatch || — || align=right | 2.1 km || 
|-id=934 bgcolor=#d6d6d6
| 345934 ||  || — || September 13, 2007 || Kitt Peak || Spacewatch || THM || align=right | 2.8 km || 
|-id=935 bgcolor=#E9E9E9
| 345935 ||  || — || September 14, 2007 || Kitt Peak || Spacewatch || — || align=right | 2.5 km || 
|-id=936 bgcolor=#E9E9E9
| 345936 ||  || — || September 15, 2007 || Kitt Peak || Spacewatch || AGN || align=right | 1.3 km || 
|-id=937 bgcolor=#d6d6d6
| 345937 ||  || — || September 15, 2007 || Kitt Peak || Spacewatch || CHA || align=right | 1.9 km || 
|-id=938 bgcolor=#E9E9E9
| 345938 ||  || — || September 5, 2007 || Catalina || CSS || — || align=right | 2.9 km || 
|-id=939 bgcolor=#E9E9E9
| 345939 ||  || — || September 5, 2007 || Catalina || CSS || — || align=right | 3.2 km || 
|-id=940 bgcolor=#E9E9E9
| 345940 ||  || — || September 5, 2007 || Catalina || CSS || — || align=right | 3.0 km || 
|-id=941 bgcolor=#E9E9E9
| 345941 ||  || — || September 9, 2007 || Kitt Peak || Spacewatch || — || align=right | 3.2 km || 
|-id=942 bgcolor=#d6d6d6
| 345942 ||  || — || September 10, 2007 || Kitt Peak || Spacewatch || — || align=right | 4.2 km || 
|-id=943 bgcolor=#E9E9E9
| 345943 ||  || — || September 10, 2007 || Kitt Peak || Spacewatch || GEF || align=right | 3.3 km || 
|-id=944 bgcolor=#E9E9E9
| 345944 ||  || — || September 13, 2007 || Mount Lemmon || Mount Lemmon Survey || — || align=right | 1.9 km || 
|-id=945 bgcolor=#d6d6d6
| 345945 ||  || — || September 15, 2007 || Mount Lemmon || Mount Lemmon Survey || KOR || align=right | 1.5 km || 
|-id=946 bgcolor=#d6d6d6
| 345946 ||  || — || September 3, 2007 || Catalina || CSS || — || align=right | 4.0 km || 
|-id=947 bgcolor=#E9E9E9
| 345947 ||  || — || September 10, 2007 || Kitt Peak || Spacewatch || AGN || align=right | 1.3 km || 
|-id=948 bgcolor=#E9E9E9
| 345948 ||  || — || September 12, 2007 || Catalina || CSS || — || align=right | 2.2 km || 
|-id=949 bgcolor=#d6d6d6
| 345949 ||  || — || September 13, 2007 || Mount Lemmon || Mount Lemmon Survey || — || align=right | 4.1 km || 
|-id=950 bgcolor=#d6d6d6
| 345950 ||  || — || September 13, 2007 || Socorro || LINEAR || — || align=right | 3.6 km || 
|-id=951 bgcolor=#d6d6d6
| 345951 ||  || — || September 15, 2007 || Mount Lemmon || Mount Lemmon Survey || — || align=right | 2.9 km || 
|-id=952 bgcolor=#d6d6d6
| 345952 ||  || — || September 20, 2007 || Farra d'Isonzo || Farra d'Isonzo || — || align=right | 1.9 km || 
|-id=953 bgcolor=#E9E9E9
| 345953 ||  || — || September 19, 2007 || Siding Spring || SSS || TIN || align=right | 1.4 km || 
|-id=954 bgcolor=#E9E9E9
| 345954 ||  || — || September 18, 2007 || Kitt Peak || Spacewatch || — || align=right | 1.9 km || 
|-id=955 bgcolor=#E9E9E9
| 345955 ||  || — || August 5, 2007 || Socorro || LINEAR || CLO || align=right | 2.6 km || 
|-id=956 bgcolor=#E9E9E9
| 345956 ||  || — || September 30, 2007 || Kitt Peak || Spacewatch || AEO || align=right | 1.4 km || 
|-id=957 bgcolor=#E9E9E9
| 345957 ||  || — || September 25, 2007 || Mount Lemmon || Mount Lemmon Survey || — || align=right | 2.5 km || 
|-id=958 bgcolor=#E9E9E9
| 345958 ||  || — || September 25, 2007 || Mount Lemmon || Mount Lemmon Survey || AGN || align=right | 1.4 km || 
|-id=959 bgcolor=#E9E9E9
| 345959 ||  || — || September 21, 2007 || XuYi || PMO NEO || DOR || align=right | 2.4 km || 
|-id=960 bgcolor=#E9E9E9
| 345960 ||  || — || October 5, 2007 || Pla D'Arguines || R. Ferrando || — || align=right | 2.1 km || 
|-id=961 bgcolor=#E9E9E9
| 345961 ||  || — || October 2, 2007 || Antares || ARO || AGN || align=right | 1.2 km || 
|-id=962 bgcolor=#E9E9E9
| 345962 ||  || — || October 11, 2007 || Eskridge || G. Hug || NEM || align=right | 2.9 km || 
|-id=963 bgcolor=#E9E9E9
| 345963 ||  || — || October 6, 2007 || Kitt Peak || Spacewatch || MIS || align=right | 2.9 km || 
|-id=964 bgcolor=#E9E9E9
| 345964 ||  || — || March 4, 2005 || Mount Lemmon || Mount Lemmon Survey || HEN || align=right | 1.5 km || 
|-id=965 bgcolor=#E9E9E9
| 345965 ||  || — || March 9, 2005 || Mount Lemmon || Mount Lemmon Survey || AGN || align=right | 1.1 km || 
|-id=966 bgcolor=#d6d6d6
| 345966 ||  || — || October 4, 2007 || Kitt Peak || Spacewatch || HYG || align=right | 3.3 km || 
|-id=967 bgcolor=#d6d6d6
| 345967 ||  || — || October 8, 2007 || Mount Lemmon || Mount Lemmon Survey || CHA || align=right | 2.7 km || 
|-id=968 bgcolor=#d6d6d6
| 345968 ||  || — || October 6, 2007 || Kitt Peak || Spacewatch || — || align=right | 2.6 km || 
|-id=969 bgcolor=#d6d6d6
| 345969 ||  || — || September 12, 2007 || Mount Lemmon || Mount Lemmon Survey || — || align=right | 2.7 km || 
|-id=970 bgcolor=#d6d6d6
| 345970 ||  || — || October 8, 2007 || Mount Lemmon || Mount Lemmon Survey || — || align=right | 3.2 km || 
|-id=971 bgcolor=#E9E9E9
| 345971 Marktorrence ||  ||  || October 14, 2007 || CBA-NOVAC || D. R. Skillman || HOF || align=right | 2.7 km || 
|-id=972 bgcolor=#E9E9E9
| 345972 Rufin ||  ||  || October 14, 2007 || Saint-Sulpice || B. Christophe || AST || align=right | 1.6 km || 
|-id=973 bgcolor=#d6d6d6
| 345973 ||  || — || October 15, 2007 || Calvin-Rehoboth || Calvin–Rehoboth Obs. || — || align=right | 2.6 km || 
|-id=974 bgcolor=#E9E9E9
| 345974 ||  || — || October 8, 2007 || Catalina || CSS || — || align=right | 2.6 km || 
|-id=975 bgcolor=#E9E9E9
| 345975 ||  || — || October 8, 2007 || Anderson Mesa || LONEOS || — || align=right | 2.4 km || 
|-id=976 bgcolor=#d6d6d6
| 345976 ||  || — || October 9, 2007 || Kitt Peak || Spacewatch || EOS || align=right | 2.1 km || 
|-id=977 bgcolor=#d6d6d6
| 345977 ||  || — || October 9, 2007 || Mount Lemmon || Mount Lemmon Survey || EOS || align=right | 1.8 km || 
|-id=978 bgcolor=#d6d6d6
| 345978 ||  || — || October 6, 2007 || Kitt Peak || Spacewatch || — || align=right | 1.8 km || 
|-id=979 bgcolor=#E9E9E9
| 345979 ||  || — || October 8, 2007 || Kitt Peak || Spacewatch || — || align=right | 1.9 km || 
|-id=980 bgcolor=#E9E9E9
| 345980 ||  || — || October 8, 2007 || Kitt Peak || Spacewatch || — || align=right | 2.8 km || 
|-id=981 bgcolor=#E9E9E9
| 345981 ||  || — || October 9, 2007 || Kitt Peak || Spacewatch || AGN || align=right | 1.3 km || 
|-id=982 bgcolor=#d6d6d6
| 345982 ||  || — || October 9, 2007 || Mount Lemmon || Mount Lemmon Survey || — || align=right | 3.6 km || 
|-id=983 bgcolor=#E9E9E9
| 345983 ||  || — || October 6, 2007 || Socorro || LINEAR || — || align=right | 2.8 km || 
|-id=984 bgcolor=#E9E9E9
| 345984 ||  || — || October 8, 2007 || Socorro || LINEAR || — || align=right | 2.2 km || 
|-id=985 bgcolor=#d6d6d6
| 345985 ||  || — || September 24, 2007 || Kitt Peak || Spacewatch || — || align=right | 3.4 km || 
|-id=986 bgcolor=#d6d6d6
| 345986 ||  || — || September 3, 2002 || Palomar || NEAT || — || align=right | 3.0 km || 
|-id=987 bgcolor=#E9E9E9
| 345987 ||  || — || October 12, 2007 || Socorro || LINEAR || — || align=right | 2.7 km || 
|-id=988 bgcolor=#E9E9E9
| 345988 ||  || — || October 12, 2007 || Socorro || LINEAR || HNA || align=right | 2.5 km || 
|-id=989 bgcolor=#d6d6d6
| 345989 ||  || — || October 12, 2007 || Socorro || LINEAR || URS || align=right | 5.2 km || 
|-id=990 bgcolor=#FA8072
| 345990 ||  || — || October 15, 2007 || Socorro || LINEAR || H || align=right data-sort-value="0.54" | 540 m || 
|-id=991 bgcolor=#E9E9E9
| 345991 ||  || — || October 4, 2007 || Kitt Peak || Spacewatch || — || align=right | 3.3 km || 
|-id=992 bgcolor=#E9E9E9
| 345992 ||  || — || October 4, 2007 || Kitt Peak || Spacewatch || MRX || align=right | 1.2 km || 
|-id=993 bgcolor=#d6d6d6
| 345993 ||  || — || October 5, 2007 || Purple Mountain || PMO NEO || — || align=right | 4.1 km || 
|-id=994 bgcolor=#d6d6d6
| 345994 ||  || — || October 8, 2007 || Anderson Mesa || LONEOS || — || align=right | 3.5 km || 
|-id=995 bgcolor=#E9E9E9
| 345995 ||  || — || October 8, 2007 || Anderson Mesa || LONEOS || — || align=right | 2.2 km || 
|-id=996 bgcolor=#d6d6d6
| 345996 ||  || — || October 13, 2007 || Gaisberg || R. Gierlinger || K-2 || align=right | 1.4 km || 
|-id=997 bgcolor=#d6d6d6
| 345997 ||  || — || October 7, 2007 || Mount Lemmon || Mount Lemmon Survey || KOR || align=right | 1.2 km || 
|-id=998 bgcolor=#d6d6d6
| 345998 ||  || — || October 7, 2007 || Mount Lemmon || Mount Lemmon Survey || HYG || align=right | 3.0 km || 
|-id=999 bgcolor=#d6d6d6
| 345999 ||  || — || October 8, 2007 || Kitt Peak || Spacewatch || — || align=right | 2.5 km || 
|-id=000 bgcolor=#d6d6d6
| 346000 ||  || — || October 8, 2007 || Mount Lemmon || Mount Lemmon Survey || — || align=right | 2.7 km || 
|}

References

External links 
 Discovery Circumstances: Numbered Minor Planets (345001)–(350000) (IAU Minor Planet Center)

0345